= List of national nature reserves of China =

This is a list of national nature reserves of China by province.

== Beijing ==
- Songshan National Nature Reserve

== Fujian ==
- Wuyishan National Nature Reserve

== Gansu ==
- Liancheng National Nature Reserve

== Guangdong ==
- Dinghushan National Nature Reserve

== Guizhou ==
- Cao Hai Nature Reserve
- Fanjingshan National Nature Reserve

== Hainan ==
- Hainan Bawangling National Nature Reserve
- Yinggeling National Nature Reserve

== Heilongjiang ==
- Heixiazidao National Nature Reserve
- Honghe National Nature Reserve
- Xingkaihu National Nature Reserve
- Zhalong Nature Reserve
- Zhenbaodao Wetland National Nature Reserve

== Henan ==
- Baotianman National Nature Reserve

== Hunan ==
- Dupangling National Nature Reserve
- Nanyue Hengshan National Nature Reserve

== Inner Mongolia ==
- Dalai Lake National Nature Reserve

== Jilin ==
- Changbaishan National Nature Reserve
- Hunchun National Nature Reserve

== Qinghai ==
- Kekexili Wildlife Protection Reserve
- Sanjiangyuan National Nature Reserve

== Shaanxi ==
- Foping National Nature Reserve
- Changqing National Nature Reserve

== Shandong ==
- Sanjiangyuan National Nature Reserve
- Shanwang National Geological Park

== Shanghai ==
- Jiuduansha Wetland Nature Reserve

== Sichuan ==
- Dafengding Nature Reserve
- Wolong National Nature Reserve

== Tibet ==
- Xainza Nature Reserve

== Xinjiang ==
- Altun Shan National Nature Reserve
- Bayanbulak Grassland National Nature Reserve
- Aibi Lake Wetland Nature Reserve
- Lop Nur Wild Camel National Nature Reserve

== Yunnan ==
- Ailaoshan National Nature Reserve
- Dashanbao Black-necked Crane National Nature Reserve
- Gaoligongshan National Nature Reserve

== Zhejiang ==
- Fengyangshan–Baishanzu National Nature Reserve
- Gutianshan National Nature Reserve
- Tianmushan National Nature Reserve
- Wuyanling National Nature Reserve

== See also ==
- List of protected areas of China
