= China Biosphere Reserve Network =

Group of protected areas in China

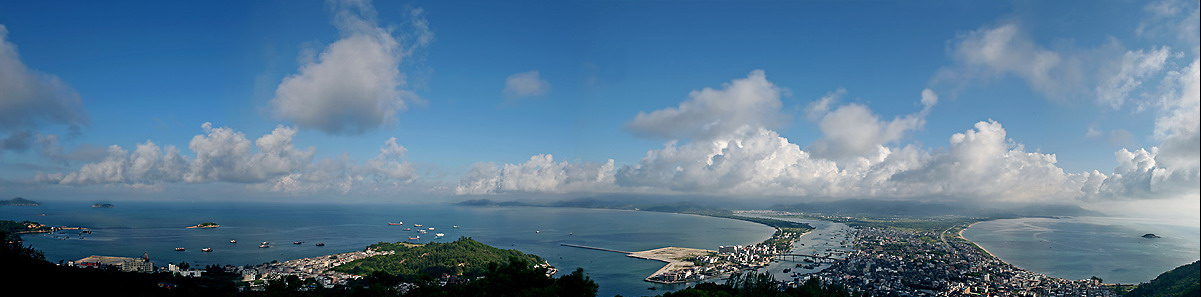
Huidong Gangkou Sea Turtles National Nature Reserve

China Biosphere Reserve Network (CBRN) is a network established by the Chinese National Committee for UNESCO Man and the Biosphere Programme in 1993. Membership in the CBRN serves as a prerequisite for joining the World Network of Biosphere Reserves (WNBR). At present there are 214 members in the CBRN, including 36 UNESCO Biosphere Reserves.

Note: "China Biosphere Reserve" is a nominal designation granted to the member reserves.

- Beijing (2)
  - Songshan National Nature Reserve
  - Baihuashan National Nature Reserve
- Tianjin (2)
  - Paleocoast and Wetland National Nature Reserve
  - Jixian Middle-Upper Proterozoic Stratigraphic Section National Nature Reserve
- Hebei (5)
  - Changli Huangjin Hai'an National Nature Reserve
  - Wulingshan National Nature Reserve
  - Hengshuihu National Nature Reserve
  - Liujiang Pendi Geosites National Nature Reserve
  - Dahaituo National Nature Reserve
- Shanxi (3)
  - Pangquangou National Nature Reserve
  - Lishan National Nature Reserve
  - Wutaishan Meadow Provincial Nature Reserve
- Inner Mongolia (26)
  - Xilingol Steppe National Nature Reserve (WNBR)
  - Saihan Ul National Nature Reserve (WNBR)
  - Hulunhu National Nature Reserve (WNBR, as "Dalai Lake")
  - Bayan Obo National Nature Reserve
  - Heilihe National Nature Reserve
  - Daheishan National Nature Reserve
  - Horqin National Nature Reserve
  - Xi Ordos National Nature Reserve
  - Nei Mongol Helanshan National Nature Reserve
  - Nei Mongol Darbin Hu National Forest Park
  - Nei Mongol Huanggangliang National Forest Park
  - Dal Nur National Nature Reserve
  - Gogastai Han Ul National Nature Reserve
  - Temeji National Nature Reserve
  - Huihe National Nature Reserve
  - Honggolj Mongolian Scots Pine Forest National Nature Reserve
  - Da Hinggan Ling Hanma National Nature Reserve (WNBR)
  - Alxa Bactrian Camel National Conservation Area
  - Inner Mongolia Cashmere Goat (Alxa Type) National Conservation Area
  - Gurgastai National Nature Reserve
  - Ergun National Nature Reserve
  - Bilahe National Nature Reserve
  - Daqingshan National Nature Reserve (WNBR)
  - Ergun National Wetland Park
  - Wulanba National Nature Reserve
  - Ningcheng National Geopark
- Liaoning (5)
  - Shedao, Laotieshan National Nature Reserve (WNBR)
  - Baishilazi National Nature Reserve
  - Yiwulüshan National Nature Reserve
  - Liaohekou National Nature Reserve
  - Chengshantou Coastal Landforms National Nature Reserve
- Jilin (5)
  - Changbaishan National Nature Reserve (WNBR)
  - Yitong Volcano Group National Nature Reserve
  - Longwan National Nature Reserve
  - Xianghai National Nature Reserve
  - Wangqing National Nature Reserve
- Heilongjiang (12)
  - Fenglin National Nature Reserve (WNBR)
  - Wudalianchi National Nature Reserve (WNBR)
  - Zhalong National Nature Reserve
  - Xingkaihu National Nature Reserve (WNBR)
  - Liangshui National Nature Reserve
  - Huzhong National Nature Reserve
  - Wuyiling National Nature Reserve
  - Cuibei Wetland National Nature Reserve
  - Honghe National Nature Reserve
  - Zhenbaodao Wetland National Nature Reserve
  - Naolihe National Nature Reserve
  - Sanjiang National Nature Reserve
- Shanghai (2)
  - Chongming Dongtan Birds National Nature Reserve, Chongming County
  - Jiuduansha Wetland National Nature Reserve
- Jiangsu (4)
  - Yancheng Littoral Mudflats and Valuable Fowls National Nature Reserve (WNBR)
  - Dafeng Père David's Deer National Nature Reserve
  - Nanjing Yangtze Finless Porpoise Provincial Nature Reserve
  - Zhenjiang Yangtze River Porpoises Provincial Nature Reserve
- Zhejiang (8)
  - Tianmushan National Nature Reserve (WNBR)
  - Nanji Liedao Marine National Nature Reserve (WNBR)
  - Lin'an Qingliangfeng National Nature Reserve
  - Shangougou scenic zone of Zhejiang Jingshan (Shangougou) National Forest Park
  - Qianjiangyuan park area of Zhejiang Qianjiangyuan - Baishanzu National Park System Pilot Site
  - Xianju National Park (note: not a component of the National Park System of China, covered: Xianju NSHA/NFP, Xianju Shenxianju NGP & Kuocangshan PNR)
  - Baishanzu park area of Zhejiang Qianjiangyuan - Baishanzu National Park System Pilot Site
  - Wuyanling National Nature Reserve
- Anhui (5)
  - Yaoluoping National Nature Reserve
  - Shengjinhu National Nature Reserve
  - Tongling Freshwater Dolphins National Nature Reserve
  - Huangshan National Scenic and Historic Area (WNBR)
  - Qingliangfeng National Nature Reserve, Jixi
- Fujian (7)
  - Wuyishan National Nature Reserve (WNBR)
  - Longqishan National Nature Reserve
  - Meihuashan National Nature Reserve
  - Fujian Fuzhou National Forest Park
  - Emeifeng National Nature Reserve
  - Tianbaoyan National Nature Reserve
  - Liangyeshan National Nature Reserve
- Jiangxi (8)
  - Poyanghu Migratory Birds National Nature Reserve
  - Taohongling Sika Deer National Nature Reserve
  - Jiulianshan National Nature Reserve
  - Jiangxi Wuyishan National Nature Reserve
  - Jinggangshan National Nature Reserve (WNBR)
  - Wuzhifeng Provincial Nature Reserve
  - Guanshan National Nature Reserve
  - Nanfengmian National Nature Reserve
- Shandong (3)
  - Huanghe Sanjiaozhou National Nature Reserve
  - Shanwang National Geological Park
  - Kunyushan National Nature Reserve
- Henan (7)
  - Baotianman National Nature Reserve (WNBR)
  - Jigongshan National Nature Reserve
  - Liankangshan National Nature Reserve
  - Xiaoqinling National Nature Reserve
  - Dongzhai National Nature Reserve
  - Huanghe Wetland National Nature Reserve (Sanmenxia section)
  - Danjiang Wetland National Nature Reserve
- Hubei (9)
  - Shennongjia National Nature Reserve (WNBR)
  - Changjiang Tian'ezhou Whitefin Dolphin National Nature Reserve
  - Whitefin Dolphin National Nature Reserve at Xinluo Section of Yangtze River
  - Wufeng Houhe National Nature Reserve
  - Dalaoling National Nature Reserve
  - Hewangmiao Yangtze Finless Porpoise Provincial Nature Reserve
  - Qizimeishan National Nature Reserve
  - Mulinzi National Nature Reserve
  - Nanhe National Nature Reserve
- Hunan (5)
  - Badagongshan National Nature Reserve
  - Hupingshan National Nature Reserve
  - Jiuyishan National Nature Reserve
  - Hunan Nanshan National Park System Pilot Site
  - Zhangjiajie Chinese Giant Salamander National Nature Reserve
- Guangdong (17)
  - Dinghushan National Nature Reserve (WNBR)
  - Nanling National Nature Reserve
  - Chebaling National Nature Reserve (WNBR) *
  - Neilingdingdao - Futian National Nature Reserve
  - Huidong Gangkou Sea Turtles National Nature Reserve
  - Shenzhen CAS Xianhu Botanical Garden
  - Zhujiangkou Chinese White Dolphin National Nature Reserve, Pearl River (Zhūjiāng)
  - Leizhou Valuable and Rare Marine Organisms National Nature Reserve
  - Shixing Nanshan Provincial Nature Reserve
  - Xiangtoushan National Nature Reserve
  - Zhanjiang Mangrove Forest National Nature Reserve
  - Danxiashan National Nature Reserve
  - Xuwen Coral Reef National Nature Reserve
  - Leizhou Wushi National Marine Park
  - Nanpeng Liedao National Nature Reserve
  - Nanxiong Xiaoliukeng - Qingzhangshan Provincial Nature Reserve
  - Zhuhai Qi'ao-Dangandao Provincial Nature Reserve
- Guangxi (12)
  - Shankou Mangrove Ecosystem National Nature Reserve (WNBR)
  - Damingshan National Nature Reserve
  - Huaping National Nature Reserve
  - Mao'ershan National Nature Reserve (WNBR)
  - Beilunhekou National Nature Reserve
  - Longgang National Nature Reserve
  - Dayaoshan National Nature Reserve
  - Mulun National Nature Reserve
  - Jiuwanshan National Nature Reserve
  - Hepu Yingpangang - Yingluogang Dugong National Nature Reserve
  - Yachang Orchid Plants National Nature Reserve
  - Chongzuo White-headed Black Langur National Nature Reserve
- Hainan (4)
  - Sanya Coral Reef National Nature Reserve
  - Datian National Nature Reserve
  - Jianfengling National Nature Reserve
  - Dazhoudao Marine Ecosystem National Nature Reserve
- Chongqing (2)
  - Xuebaoshan National Nature Reserve
  - Yintiaoling National Nature Reserve
- Sichuan (13)
  - Wolong National Nature Reserve (WNBR)
  - Jiuzhaigou National Nature Reserve (WNBR)
  - Huanglongsi Provincial Nature Reserve (WNBR)
  - Yading National Nature Reserve (WNBR)
  - Tangjiahe National Nature Reserve
  - Changning Zhuhai National Nature Reserve
  - Miyaluo Provincial Scenic and Historic Area
  - Longxi - Hongkou National Nature Reserve
  - Dongyanggou Provincial Nature Reserve
  - Maozhai Provincial Nature Reserve
  - Micangshan National Nature Reserve
  - Xuebaoding National Nature Reserve
  - Baiyang Provincial Nature Reserve
- Guizhou (10)
  - Fanjingshan National Nature Reserve (WNBR)
  - Maolan National Nature Reserve (WNBR)
  - Xishui Mid-subtropical Evergreen Broad-leaved Forest National Nature Reserve
  - Chishui Spinulose Tree Fern National Nature Reserve
  - Mayanghe National Nature Reserve
  - Weining Caohai National Nature Reserve
  - Leigongshan National Nature Reserve
  - Kuankuoshui National Nature Reserve
  - Dashahe National Nature Reserve
  - Fodingshan National Nature Reserve
- Yunnan (7)
  - Gaoligongshan National Nature Reserve (WNBR)
  - Xishuangbanna National Nature Reserve (WNBR)
  - Tongbiguan Provincial Nature Reserve
  - Xishuangbanna Nabanhe Liuyu National Nature Reserve
  - Yunlong Tianchi National Nature Reserve
  - Cangshan Erhai National Nature Reserve
  - Huize Black-necked Crane National Nature Reserve
- Tibet (1)
  - Qomolangma Feng National Nature Reserve (WNBR)
- Shaanxi (12)
  - Foping National Nature Reserve (WNBR)
  - Taibaishan National Nature Reserve
  - Changqing National Nature Reserve
  - Hanzhong Crested Ibis National Nature Reserve
  - CAS Shaanxi Qinling Botanical Garden
  - Niubeiliang National Nature Reserve (WNBR)
  - Tianhuashan National Nature Reserve
  - Pingheliang National Nature Reserve
  - Hancheng Huanglongshan Brown Eared-Pheasant National Nature Reserve
  - Hualongshan National Nature Reserve
  - Huangbaiyuan National Nature Reserve
  - Zhouzhi National Nature Reserve (WNBR)
- Gansu (5)
  - Baishuijiang National Nature Reserve (WNBR)
  - Qilianshan National Nature Reserve
  - Anxi Extreme-arid Desert National Nature Reserve
  - Lianhuashan National Nature Reserve
  - Yanchiwan National Nature Reserve
- Qinghai (1)
  - Sanjiangyuan National Park
- Ningxia (3)
  - Helanshan National Nature Reserve
  - Yunwushan National Nature Reserve
  - Habahu National Nature Reserve
- Xinjiang (9)
  - Chinese Temperate Desert Region and the North Foot of Bogda Peak Biosphere Reserve (WNBR)
  - Altun Shan National Nature Reserve
  - Hanas National Nature Reserve
  - Tarim Euphrates Poplar National Nature Reserve
  - Qitai Desert Type Grassland Autonomous Regional Nature Reserve
  - Middle Tianshan Künes Mountain-Meadow Type Grassland Autonomous Regional Nature Reserve
  - Altai Shan Liangheyuan Autonomous Regional Nature Reserve
  - Bulgan He Eurasian Beaver National Nature Reserve
  - Karameili Shan Wild Ungulates Autonomous Regional Nature Reserve

== See also ==
- List of UNESCO Biosphere Reserves in China
- Category:Protected areas of China
- World Network of Biosphere Reserves in Asia and the Pacific
