= Qi Zai =

World's only captive brown panda (born c. 2009)

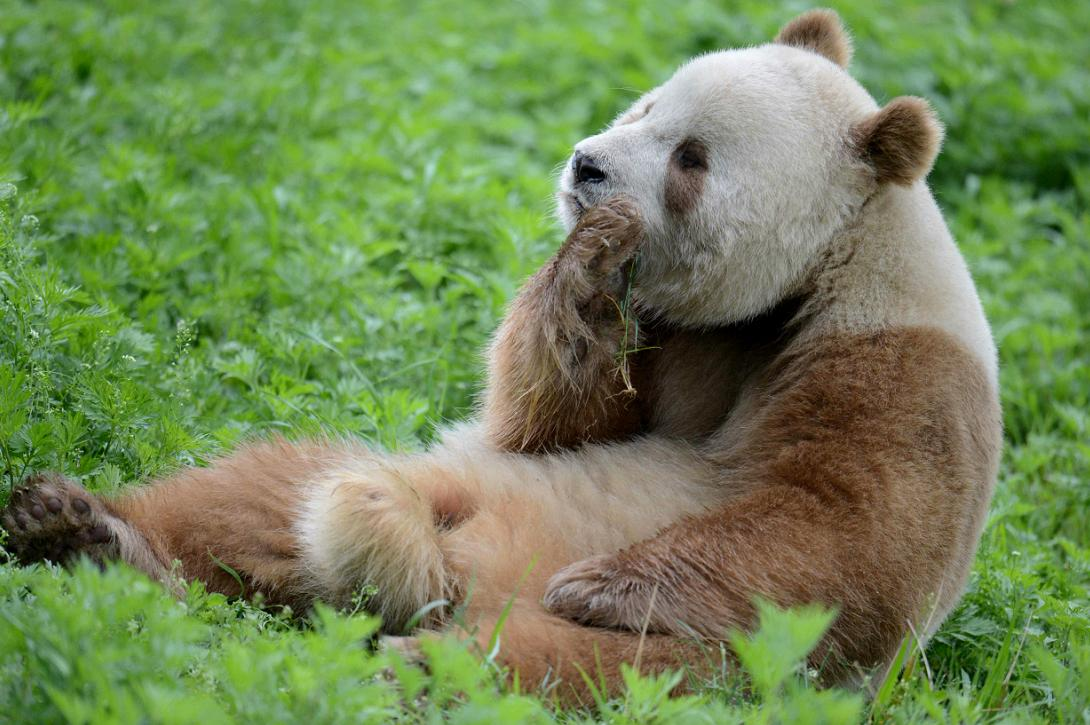
- Qi Zai in November 2015
- Species: Qinling panda
- Sex: Male
- Born: c. 2009; Qinling, Shaanxi, China
- Known for: World's only known living brown-and-white giant panda in captivity
- Residence: Foping Panda Valley (Qinling Giant Panda Research Center), Shaanxi, China
- Parent: Unknown
- Offspring: Rong Rong (荣荣; 2022)
- Named after: The seventh son

Qi Zai (Chinese: 七仔; pinyin: Qī Zǎi; lit. 'The Seventh Son'; born c. 2009) is a male brown-and-white giant panda and the only known brown giant panda living in captivity. He belongs to the Qinling panda subspecies, native to the Qinling Mountains of Shaanxi, China. His unusual brown fur, which replaces the typical black markings found on giant and Qinling pandas, is due to a genetic mutation.

== Early life and rescue ==
Qi Zai was born around 2009 in the wild in the Qinling Mountains. On 1 November 2009, he was found weak, dehydrated and abandoned in the Foping National Nature Reserve and taken in for emergency care. He was estimated to be about two months old, and believed to have been abandoned by his mother. Keepers named him after the creature in the film CJ7, which he was thought to resemble.

Because of Qi Zai's unusual brown-and-white coloration, rescuers were initially unsure of his identity, but specialists later confirmed that he was a rare brown giant panda, which have been spotted in the Qinling Mountains five times from 1985 to 2015. He became the second brown giant panda known to be kept in captivity after the female panda Dandan.

== Captivity ==
After his rescue, Qi Zai was taken to the Shaanxi Rare Wild Animal Rescue and Breeding Research Center, since renamed the Qinling Giant Panda Research Center, in Xi'an, Shaanxi, where he has been kept since. As of January 2026, Qi Zai weighed about 120 kilograms (260 lb) and remained at the centre, where he is the main visitor attraction.

== Breeding ==
In 2020, Qi Zai successfully completed natural mating with a female panda named An An, marking the first successful natural mating recorded for the world's only captive brown panda. Researchers expressed interest in whether his rare brown coloration, believed to be linked to uncommon genetic traits, could be passed to future offspring. In 2022, Qi Zai fathered a cub, Rong Rong.

== Coloration and genetics ==
Qi Zai belongs to the Qinling panda, a subspecies of giant panda native to the Qinling Mountains of Shaanxi. The subspecies was recognized as distinct on 30 June 2005. Researchers believe it diverged from other giant panda populations around 300,000 years ago.

Most Qinling pandas are black and white, and brown-and-white individuals such as Qi Zai are rare. Every scientifically recorded case has occurred within the Qinling range. Wild brown pandas had been recorded eleven times in the Qinling Mountains as of 2024, most recently in January of that year in the Changqing National Nature Reserve.

The genetic basis of Qi Zai's coloration was reported in 2024 by a team led by Wei Fuwen and Hu Yibo of the Institute of Zoology, Chinese Academy of Sciences, in the Proceedings of the National Academy of Sciences. Sequencing Qi Zai's genome alongside those of other brown and black-and-white pandas, the researchers identified a homozygous 25-base-pair deletion in the Bace2 gene as the most likely cause of the brown-and-white coat. The team confirmed the effect with a CRISPR-Cas9 knockout mouse model, in which mice carrying the mutation developed lighter fur. The coloration follows an autosomal recessive pattern of inheritance, and none of Qi Zai's offspring has inherited it.

== See also ==
- List of individual giant pandas
