= Aotai trail =

Hiking trail in China

Aotai Trail
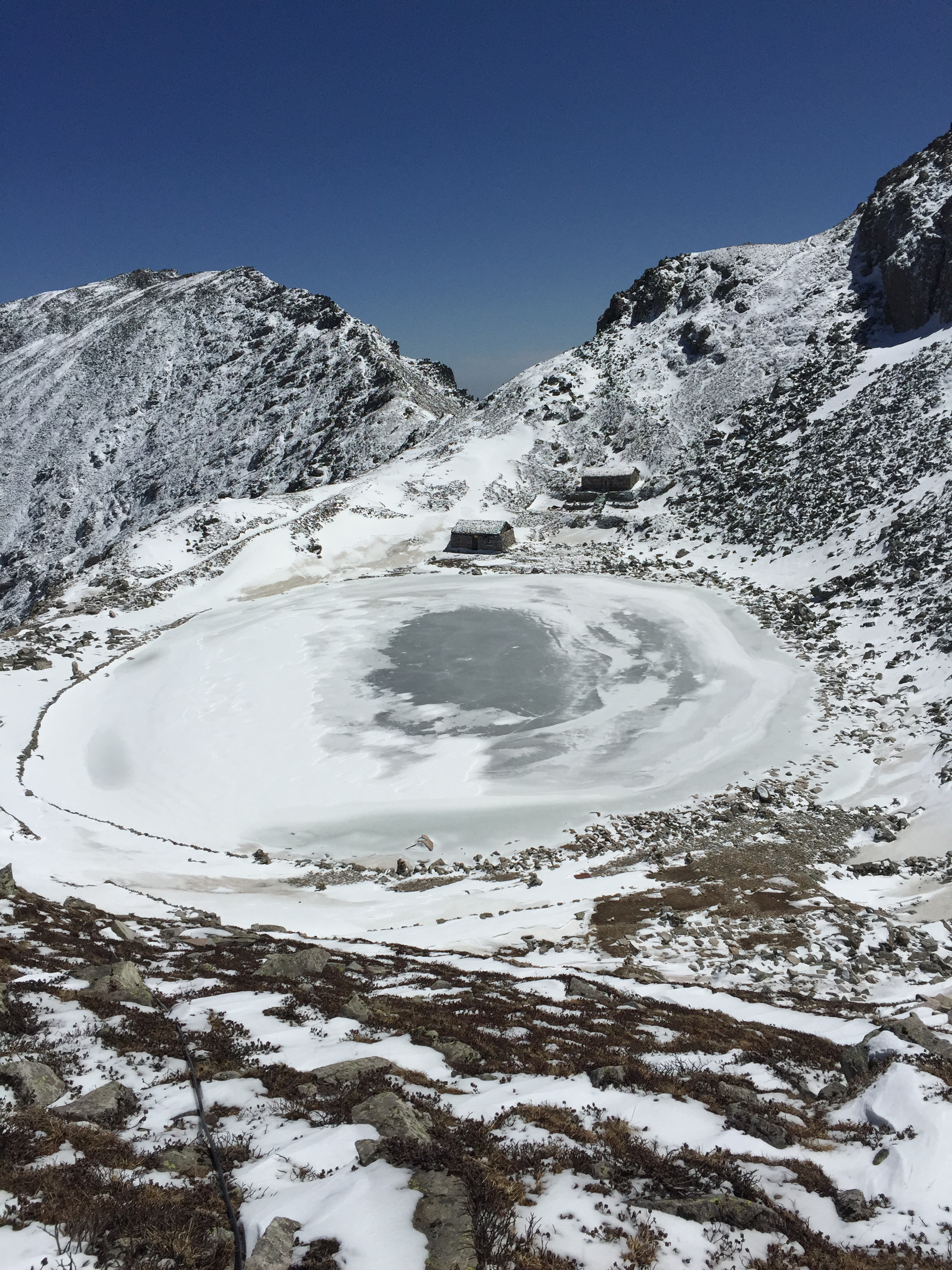
- Daye Lake on Mount Taibai
- Length: 170 km (110 mi)
- Location: Mount Taibai Nature Reserve, Shaanxi, China
- Highest point: Mount Taibai, 3,767 metres (12,359 ft)

The Aotai trail or the Aotai line (Chinese: 鳌太线) is a hiking trail in the Qinling mountain range in Shaanxi, China, known as one of China's deadliest trails. The trail's route includes a 80 kilometres (50 mi) long mountain ridge between Mount Taibai (3,767 metres [12,359 ft]) and Mount Ao (鳌山, 3,476 metres [11,404 ft]), the two highest peaks in the range. In total, hikers are required to cross 17 peaks above 3,000 metres (9,800 ft). Hiking on the Aotai trail was banned in 2018 due to both environmental and safety concerns.

== History ==
While mountaineers and pilgrims frequently visited Mount Taibai and Mount Ao, the first reported traverse of the connecting mountain ridge did not take place until 2001. The first accident on the trail occurred in 2008, in which one hiker went missing. The trail became popular in the 2010s. According to a report by the Chinese Mountaineering Association, 14 died and 4 went missing on the Aotai trail between 2012 and 2018. In 2014, a monument was erected to commemorate the lost hikers.

In 2018, the Mount Taibai Nature Reserve banned entry to the Aotai trail, after concerns were raised about both the increasing number of emergencies and about human activities affecting the endemic Qinling panda and golden takin populations. However, hikers have continued to visit the mountain ridge. From 2018 to 2024, at least 12 more died on the route. In January 2026, 3 hikers died after illegally entering the trail in heavy fog and snow. Since 2000, there have been at least 75 incidents and many large scale rescues. In the past, many rescues were conducted by volunteers who did not ask for payment.
