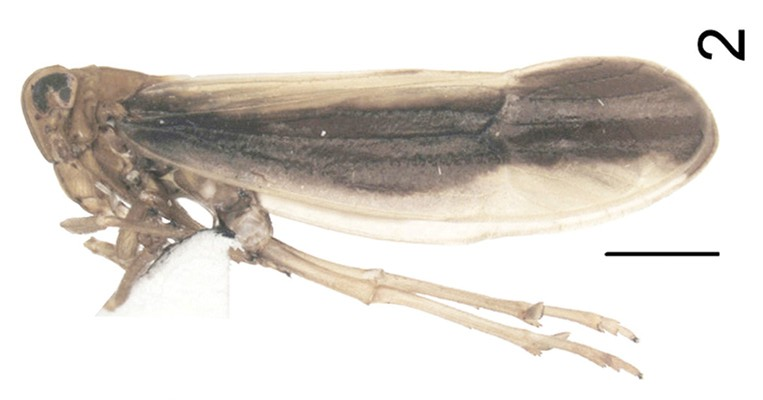
- Adult male

Scientific classification
- Kingdom: Animalia
- Phylum: Arthropoda
- Class: Insecta
- Order: Hemiptera
- Suborder: Auchenorrhyncha
- Infraorder: Fulgoromorpha
- Family: Delphacidae
- Genus: Kakuna
- Species: K. taibaiensis

Binomial name
- Kakuna taibaiensis Ren & Qin, 2014

= Kakuna taibaiensis =

Species of true bug

Kakuna taibaiensis is a species of planthopper from China.

== Etymology ==
The specific name was derived from Mount Taibai, the locality in Shaanxi where it was identified.

== Description ==
Average male body length between 5.82 millimetres (0.229 in) and 5.91 millimetres (0.233 in). Forewings, which are long and narrow, measure between 5.06 millimetres (0.199 in) and 5.13 millimetres (0.202 in) long. The hind legs have 17 spines running from the tibia to the second tarsomere. The aedeagus is arched and tube-shaped. The female has not yet been described.

The species is brownish in general coloration, with a milky stripe adorning the dorsum. The abdomen is dark brown to grey. The first two pairs of legs are brown, while the hind legs are yellowish brown and covered in black spines. The wings are yellowish-brown.

== Distribution ==
K. taibaiensis is only found around Mount Taibai in the Shaanxi province of northwestern China.
