= Eupithecia actrix =

Scientific classification
- Kingdom: Animalia
- Phylum: Arthropoda
- Clade: Pancrustacea
- Class: Insecta
- Order: Lepidoptera
- Family: Geometridae
- Genus: Eupithecia
- Species: E. actrix

Binomial name
- Eupithecia actrix Mironov & Galsworthy, 2006

Species of geometer moth

Eupithecia actrix is a moth in the family Geometridae. It is endemic to central China (Shaanxi). Only single female from Mount Taibai is known.

The wingspan is 17 mm (0.67 in) for the holotype.
