= Liancheng =

Liancheng may refer to:

- Liancheng County (连城县), Longyan, Fujian
- Liancheng National Nature Reserve (连城国家级自然保护区), in the Yellow River Basin in Gansu
- Liancheng, Lianshui County (涟城镇), town in Lianshui County, Jiangsu
- Liancheng, Lishui (联城镇), town in Liandu District, Lishui, Zhejiang
- Shanghai Liancheng (上海联城足球俱乐部), football club that competes in the Chinese Super League

== See also ==
- Liaocheng, prefecture-level city in Shandong province
