= Tainan fake panda incident =

1987 incident at a private zoo in Tainan, Taiwan

The Tainan fake panda incident was an incident at a private zoo in Tainan, Taiwan, where a sun bear was painted black and white and falsely presented to visitors as a giant panda. The bear was first unveiled on 24 December 1987 and quickly drew skepticism. Experts were not convinced and suspected fraud. By 3 January 1988, officials from the Council of Agriculture and zoology experts from National Taiwan University and Normal University determined the animal was not a true panda.

This incident made popular the use of the term "(giant) cat bear" [(dà)māoxióng, (大)貓熊] instead of "(giant) bear cat" [(dà)xióngmāo, (大)熊貓] to refer to pandas in Taiwan.
