= Foping National Nature Reserve =

Nature reserve and national park in Shaanxi Province, China

Foping Nature Reserve
- 佛坪国家级自保护区
- Location within China
- Location: Shaanxi Province, China
- Coordinates: 33.658°N 107.807°E
- Area: 350 km^{2} (140 sq mi)
- Established: 1978
- Website: www.fpnr.org

Foping Nature Reserve (simplified Chinese: 佛坪国家级自保护区; traditional Chinese: 佛坪國家級自保護區; pinyin: Fópíng guójiājí zì bǎohù qū; lit. 'Foping National Level Nature Protection Area') in Shaanxi Province, China, is a nature reserve and national park situated in the Qinling Mountains. The Nature Reserve covers 350 km^{2} (140 sq mi) and is under the leadership of the Ministry of Forestry. Foping Nature Reserve is girdled by other protected areas: It is bordered in the east by the Long-caoping Forest Farm; in the west it is flanked by the Changqing Nature Reserve; Zhouzhi Nature Reserve, the stronghold of the Golden Monkey, and Laoxiancheng Nature Reserve are situated to the north. The Foping Reserve covers 29,240 hectares (72,300 acres) of rugged mountain terrain and is home to a stable panda population. Elevations range from 1,080 to 2,094 m with warm summers and cold winters. 950–1,200 mm of rain falls mostly from July to September, with snow at higher elevations. Forested lands dominate the reserve with a mix of conifers and broadleaf deciduous trees.

== History ==
The Foping Nature Reserve was set up in 1978 with a view to protecting the giant panda.

== Roads ==
Roads end at the reserve edge to minimize human presence in the interior of the reserve.

== Flora and fauna ==
Mammals found in the reserve include the giant panda, golden monkey, mainland serow, Chinese goral, dwarf musk deer, Asiatic black bear, and North-Chinese leopard. Also red and white giant flying squirrel lives in the reserve.

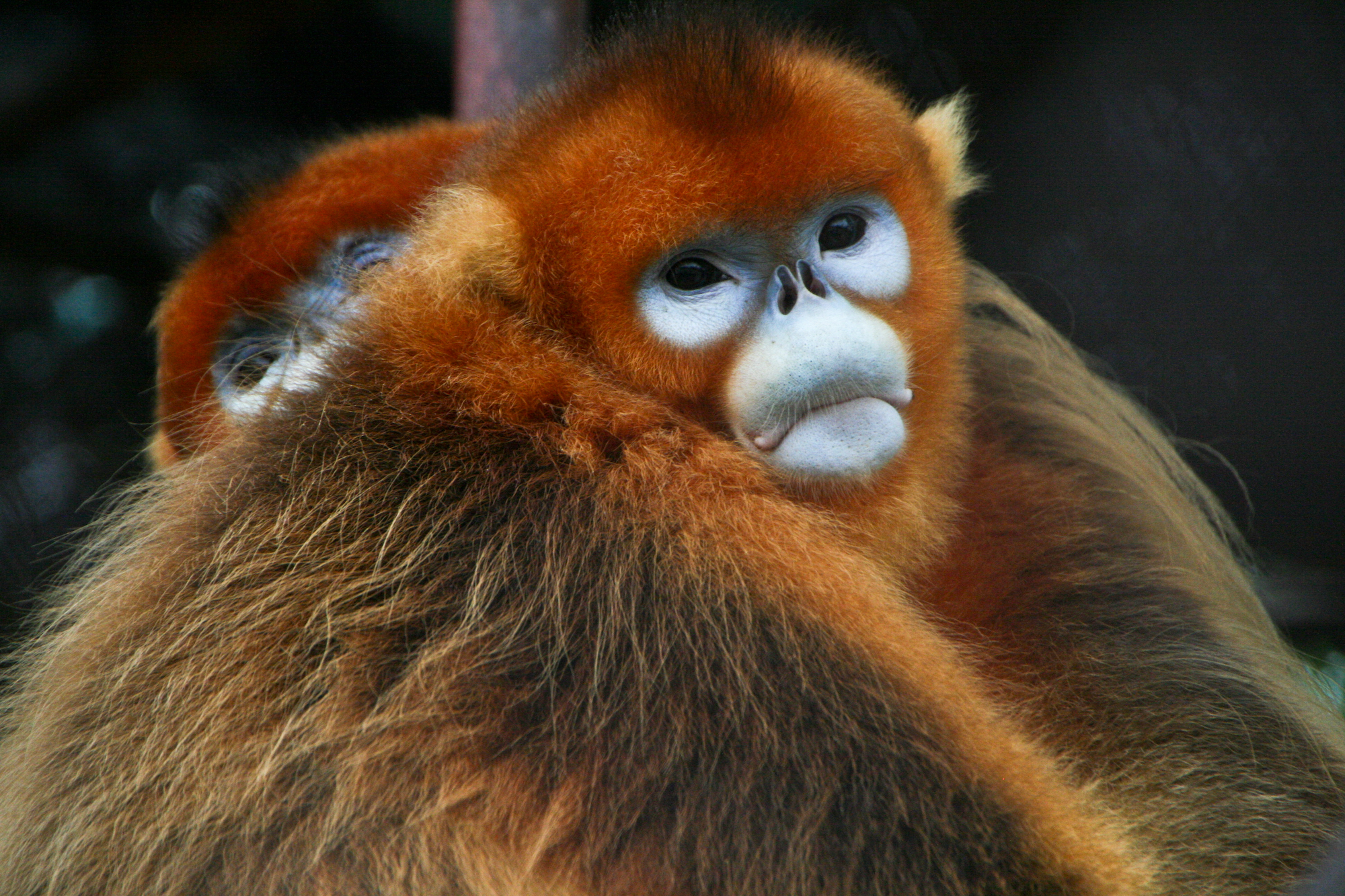
Golden Snub-nosed monkey

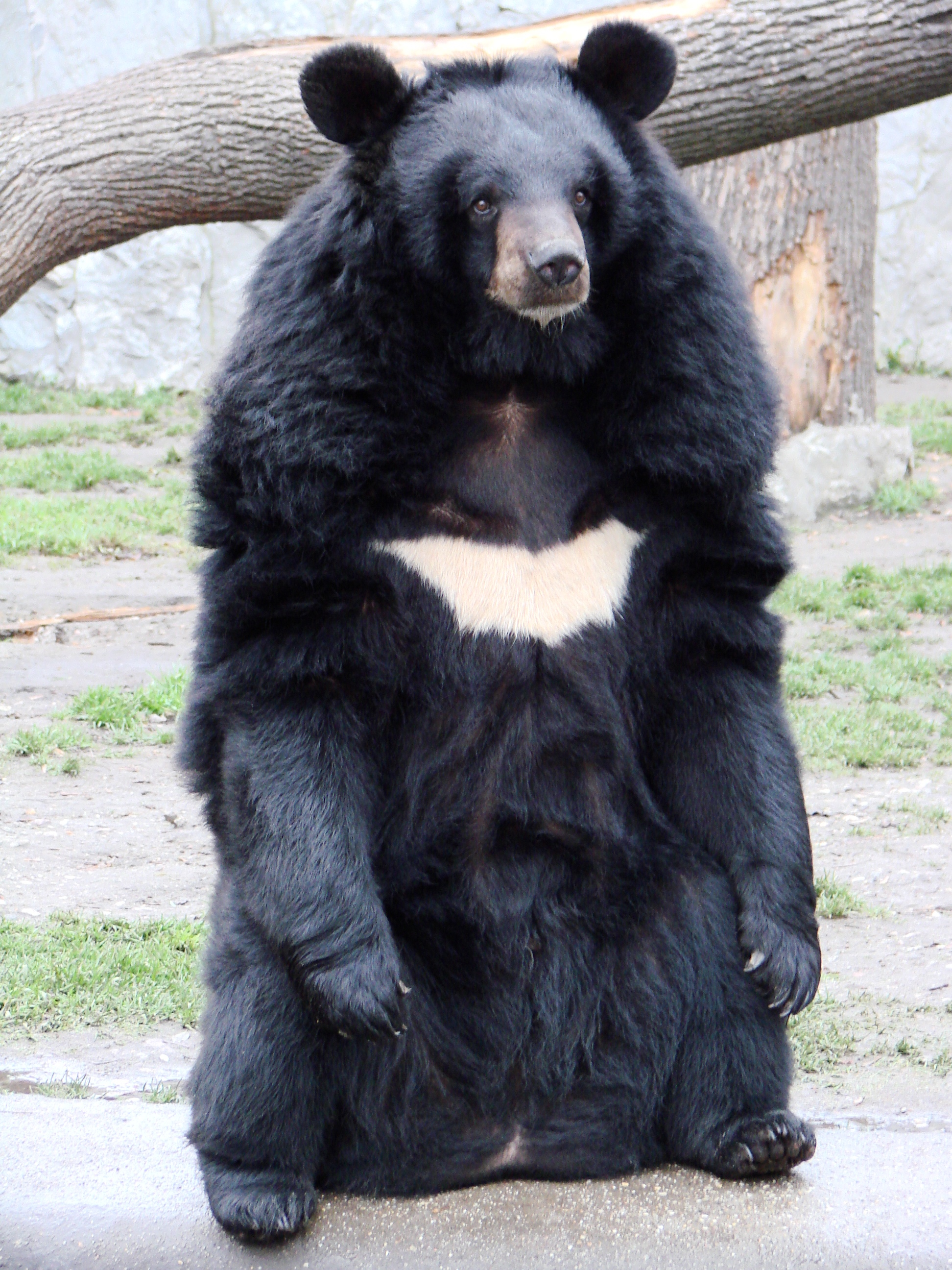
Asiatic black bear

=== Giant panda population ===
The Foping National Natural Reserve supported a relatively stable population of about 64 pandas from 1974 to 1993 where they avoided people and lived in areas with bamboo growing well.

== See also ==
Qinling panda
