= Songshan National Nature Reserve =

Nature reserve in Beijing, China

Coordinates: 40.5227°N 115.7849°E

The Songshan National Nature Reserve (松山自然保护区 sōng shān zì rán bǎo hù qū) located in Beijing near the Yanqing Winter Olympic Village, and northwest of Songshan National Park, about 13 km from Guanting Reservoir, is a nature reserve and part of the China Biosphere Reserve Network. It is home to hundreds of animal species, four of which are nationally protected: Siberian golden eagle, eastern imperial eagle, North-Chinese leopard and black stork.
