= Alanine—glyoxylate transaminase =

Class of enzymes

Alanine-glyoxylate transaminase
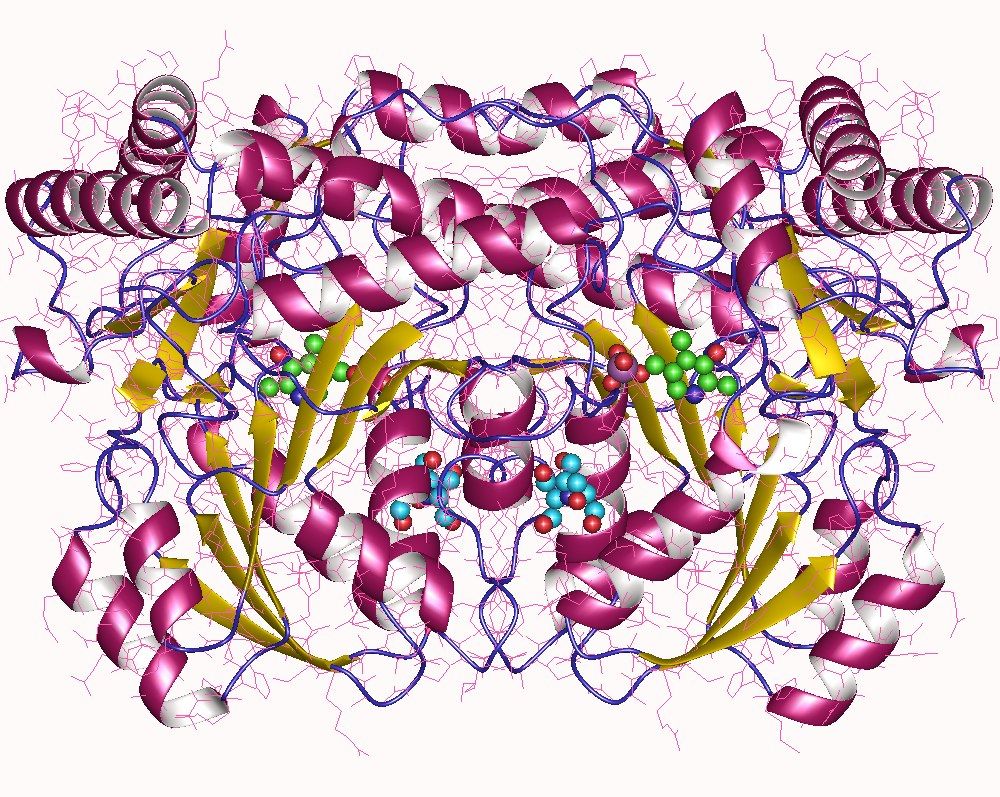
- Alanine-glyoxylate transaminase dimer, Human

Identifiers
- EC no.: 2.6.1.44
- CAS no.: 9015-67-2

Databases
- IntEnz: IntEnz view
- BRENDA: BRENDA entry
- ExPASy: NiceZyme view
- KEGG: KEGG entry
- MetaCyc: metabolic pathway
- PRIAM: profile
- PDB structures: RCSB PDB PDBe PDBsum
- Gene Ontology: AmiGO / QuickGO
Search
- PMC: articles
- PubMed: articles
- NCBI: proteins

Alanine-glyoxylate transaminase (EC 2.6.1.44) is a pyridoxal phosphate-dependent enzyme that catalyzes the chemical reaction

alanine
+
glyoxylic acid
pyruvic acid
+
glycine

The two substrates of this enzyme characterised from liver and kidney are L-alanine and glyoxylic acid. Its products are pyruvic acid and glycine.

This enzyme is a transferase, specifically a transaminase, which transfer nitrogenous groups. The systematic name of this enzyme class is L-alanine:glyoxylate aminotransferase. Other names in common use include AGT, alanine-glyoxylate aminotransferase, alanine-glyoxylic aminotransferase, and L-alanine-glycine transaminase.

== Structural studies ==
As of late 2007, 7 structures have been solved for this class of enzymes, with PDB accession codes 1H0C, 1J04, 1VJO, 2BKW, 2HUF, 2HUI, and 2HUU.
