= Mount Taibai =

Mountain in Shaanxi Province, China

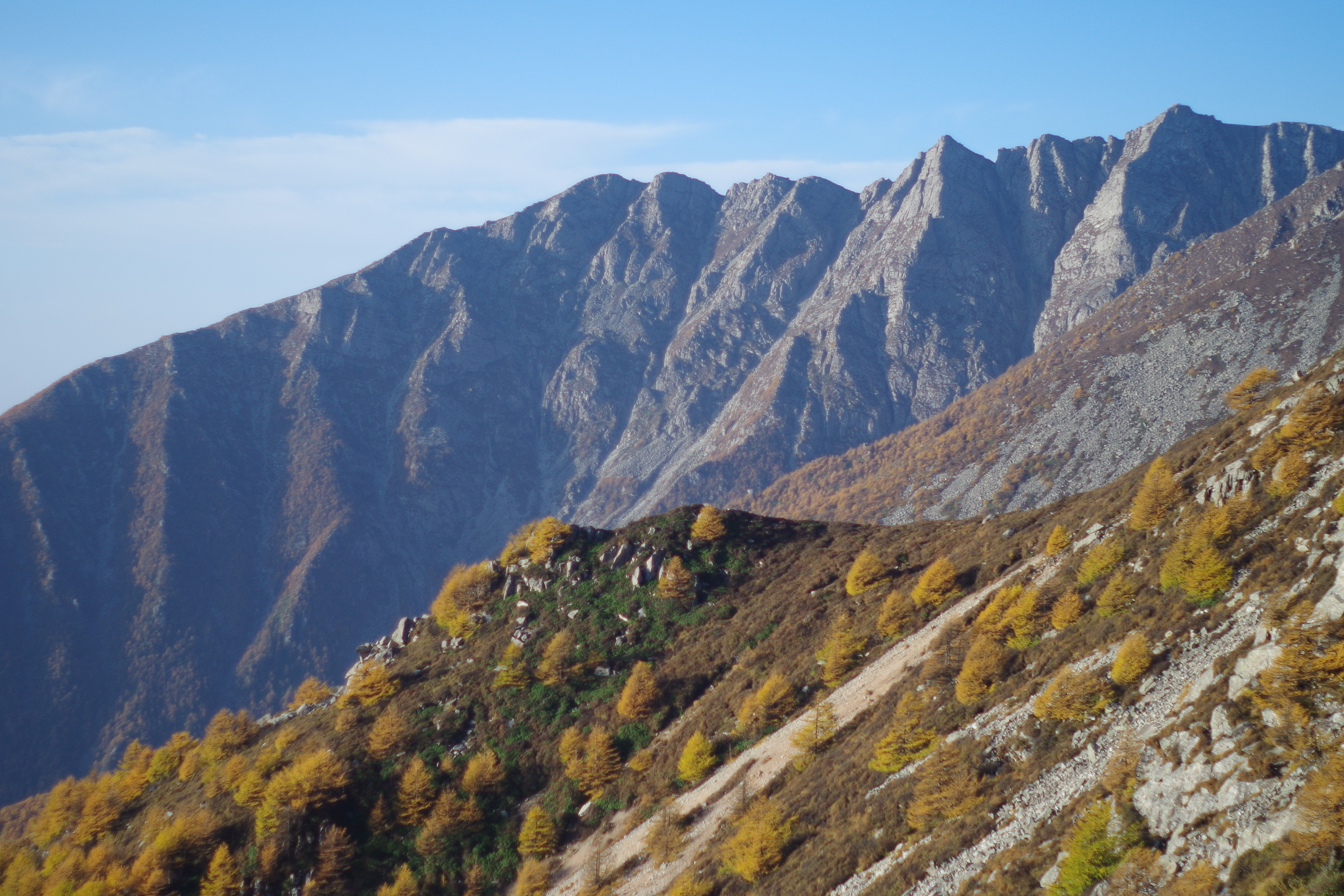

Highest point
- Elevation: 3,767 m (12,359 ft)
- Prominence: 2,232 m (7,323 ft)
- Listing: Ultra
- Coordinates: 33°57′18″N 107°45′48″E

Geography
- Location within Northern China Location within China
- Location: Shaanxi, China
- Parent range: Qinling Range

Mount Taibai (Chinese: 太白山; pinyin: Tàibái Shān) is a mountain located on the border between Mei, Taibai and Zhouzhi counties in the south west of Shaanxi Province, China on the watershed between the Han River and the Wei River. Its highest point, Baxiantai (Chinese: 拔仙台), rises to a height of 3,767 m (12,359 ft), the tallest in the Qinling Range as well as Shaanxi Province.

== History ==
Mount Taibai was historically known as Mount Taiyi (太壹山) and has also been identified with the ancient Zhongnan Mountain (終南山), although the latter identification remains disputed.. The traditional interpretation, represented by Zhu Xi's Shi jizhuan (詩集傳), places Zhongnan in the Qinling Mountains south of Chang'an(present-day Xi'an).

However, the Book of Han (漢書) identifies Mount Taiyi in Han-era Wugong County as Zhongnan, while the Commentary on the Water Classic further identifies Taiyi(太壹、太乙) with Mount Taibai.Qing scholars Qian Dian(錢坫) and Wei Yuan(魏源) therefore argued that ancient Zhongnan referred specifically to present-day Mount Taibai, rather than the mountains south of Chang'an(present-day Xi'an).

Modern scholar Li Ling(李零) similarly identifies the Zhongnan of the Classic of Poetry and the Book of Documents with Mount Taibai, and proposes Boshan (薄山、博山) as another ancient name. By the Tang dynasty, Zhongnan generally referred to the Qinling Mountains south of Chang'an(present-day Xi'an).

The name Mount Taiyi (太壹山) is first attested in Han dynasty records, notably the Book of Han (漢書). Taiyi (太壹, "Great One") was an ancient Chinese philosophical and cosmological concept, also associated with a celestial deity and a star. During the Han dynasty, Taiyi was for a time regarded as the supreme deity in the imperial state religion.

The Commentary on the Water Classic records: "During the time of Emperor Wu of Han, a Taoist temple already existed on Mount Taibai that was dedicated to Gu Chun, a man recorded in the Liexian Zhuan. The Tang dynasty work Lu Yi Ji (Chinese: 錄異記) says: "The Essence of the Golden Star fell upon the west of Zhongnan's main peak, and thus it was titled Taibai Mountain." Here, the spirit of the Golden Star metamorphosed into magnificent white jade. Ever since, the mountain has been known as Taibai Shan, literally Great (Tài) White (Bái) Mountain (Shān) and Taibai being an ancient Chinese name for the planet Venus. The name Mount Taibai also refers to the permanent snow covering the summit of what is the highest peak in the Qinling range. The poet Li Bai wrote in his gufeng poem: "How vast is great Taibai / The Stars across its slopes arrayed / From Heaven it stands three hundred li / From Mortal Earth so far away."

== Grotto-Heaven ==
Taoists believe that the sacred mountains are interconnected via an underground network of dong tien, or grotto-heavens, with dong meaning "to penetrate something" and tien referring to heaven. Going back as far as the fourth century, grotto-heavens were places where heaven and earth touched. By entering a grotto-heaven you penetrate deep within the mountain and arrive in the world of immortals: you enter "the beyond within". Mount Taibai has dozens of grotto-heaven. One of the grotto-heavens is called Place of Charm and Beauty (pinyin: Bieyou Dong Tien). Bieyou also refers to a celebrated poem "Question and Answer in the Mountain" by the poet Li Bai: "You ask me why do I dwell in these green mountains / But I smile without a reply, only an easy mind / The river flows away silently / Bearing the fallen peach blossoms / Here is another world, but not the world of man." Peach blossoms refers to the legendary Peach Blossom Valley where deep in the mountains, in "a different world", happy people (immortals) live who know nothing of our existence.

In 1933 Yu Youren, senior statesman of the Chinese Nationalist Party, poet and calligrapher, visited the Place of Charm and Beauty and wrote many poems there, including one carved into a rock which can still be seen today, right next to the grotto-heaven: "Sleeping Buddha is nice / Once asleep all troubles are gone / I want to come and sleep here / But who will look after the country."

== Three gods of Mount Taibai ==
The Sacred Mountains each have their own god or several gods and Mount Taibai is no exception. Chinese gods are often historical figures, such as Laozi, who are elevated to gods first through their popularity amongst ordinary folks and then by the ruling emperor. Stories about the origin of the three gods of Mount Taibai therefore go back a long way. The oldest tale is about a man from Li Yang by the name of Gu Chun, meaning 'Spring Valley', who lived deep inside the forests of Mount Taibai during the Han dynasty. When he died, his family buried him but during the night his body got up and they saw him leave. Local residents thus believed that he was the god of Mount Taibai and built a temple for him, calling it Taibai (and sometimes Gu Chun) Temple. More recent stories talk of not just one but three Taibai gods because, during the Yuan dynasty, there were three lakes on Taibai Shan. These lakes were revered for their water and cooling effect and were represented by the three Taibai gods, who were known as Ku Ji (Relieving the Suffering), Hui Min (Benefiting the People) and Ling Ying (Enlightening Answers). Local residents, however, called the three gods Da A Fu (The Great Fortune), Er A Fu (The Second Fortune) and San A Fu (The Third Fortune). But according to poet and politician Yu Youren, the three Taibai gods are Yao, Shun and Yu, or the three demi-gods Earth, Heaven and Water from Chinese legend. And according to the old master Ren Farong, the three Taibai gods are Bo Yi, Shu Qi and Zhou Ben from the Shang dynasty. Bo Yi and Shu Qi were two princes of the Kingdom of Gu Zhu and Zhou Ben was a general. The king made Shu Qi the crown prince even though Shu Qi was only the third son and Bo Yi the eldest. After the old king died, Shu Qi asked Bo Yi to be the new king but Bo Yi said: "We shouldn't resist our father's will," and ran away to Mount Taibai. Shu Qi did not think it was appropriate for him to succeed to the throne since tradition dictated that the throne should be inherited by the oldest son. He therefore gave the throne to the middle son, Ya Ping, and ran after Bo Yi to Mount Taibai. When the Zhou dynasty overthrew the Shang dynasty, the two brothers believed it was not right for a vassal lord such as the duke of Zhou to snatch the kingdom from its lawful ruler. Having been told that "all under heaven now belongs to the Zhou king", they refused ever to eat again and so starved to death on Mount Taibai . Zhou Ben, the general, chose the same fate. Learning of their deaths, the wise minister of the Zhou dynasty, Jiang Ziya, made the three men local gods of Mount Taibai for their great virtue and sense of righteousness. Others claim that the third god is not Zhou Ben but Li Bai, the famous poet. During the Qing dynasty of the 18th century, the province of Shaanxi requested approval from the emperor to incorporate the Taibai gods into official provincial celebrations. This did not come about immediately. In 1774, the 39th year of the Qianlong Emperor, Shaanxi province again asked for consent and this time it was granted. As a result, the Taibai gods—previously ranked as mere dukes—acquired the official title of king.

== Tiejia Ecology Temple ==
The Tiejia Ecology Temple (铁甲生态道观) is a Taoist temple located at the foot of Mount Taibai, on the site of the old Tiejiashu Temple, hidden amongst the foliage of age-old trees. The Tiejiashu (铁甲树) Temple was built at the time of the Han dynasty and remained there until the Cultural Revolution. It was one of the oldest temples dedicated to the gods of Mount Taibai and the first temple on the route taken by pilgrims along the south side of the mountain. Next to the Tiejia Taoist Ecology Temple stands the Ecology Education Center. Respect for nature has always been deeply rooted in Taoist thought and is crucial to China in the present era of ecological crisis. Through the Ecology Education Center, the Taoist monks of the Tiejia Taoist Ecology Temple are able to organize meetings and training programs designed to help people think in terms of sustainability, not only local visitors but also monks from other temples.

== Nature reserve ==
In 1965 Mount Taibai became the center of a new Nature Preserve covering the surrounding 56,325 hectares, with the purpose of protecting its warm temperate zone ecosystem. Mount Taibai has warm temperate, temperate, cool temperate, and alpine climate. The flora and fauna of Taibai are quite diverse, with species from both northern and southern Chinese environments uniquely coexisting in the region.

The base of the mountain is composed of stone covered by yellow loess soil, while the middle elevations of the mountain are covered with hardy trees and spectacular rocky outcrops. The higher elevations of the mountain contain glacial remnants, cirque, peaks, aulacogen, and moraine, all of which have proven of great use toward geological research.

== Environment ==
Flora from both the sub-tropical and warm temperate climates inhabit areas of Taibai. Due to the mountain's rapid rises in elevation, plants from the middle temperate climate and alpine climates are also found in the same areas. Within the Nature Preserve's borders more than 1,700 different types of seed-bearing plants are found, comprising approximately 60% of the flora in the Qinling Range. Among the flora are found many second- and third-tier protected Chinese species, such as chuan-guo vine (Sinofranchetia), Eucommia, Kingdonia, Dipteronia sinensis, Cercidiphyllum japonicum, Euptelea pleiosperma, Acer miaotaiense, Trochodendraceae, Sinowilsonia, Taibai rainbow (Larix chinensis), Qinling crow's head (Aconitum lioui), Chinese hemlock, Populus purdomii, Circaeasteraceae, and purple-speckled peony (Paeonia rockii), and others. About 40 types of animals inhabit the area, as well as 230 species of birds and several species of amphibians.

Mount Taibai National Forest Park is located within the borders of Tanggu in Mei County, Shaanxi.

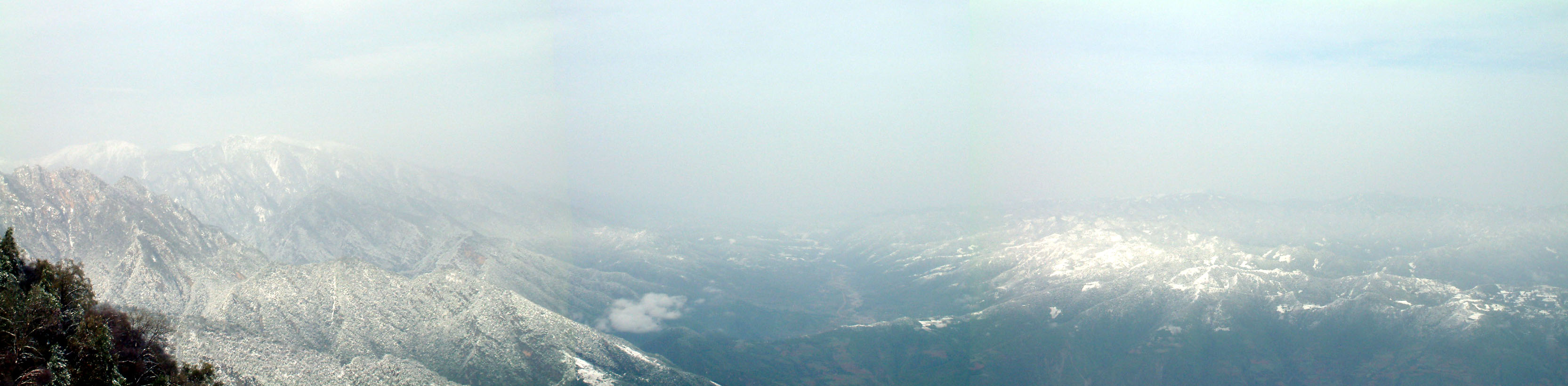
Birds-eye panorama, taken from the Bodhisattva Temple at 2300m.

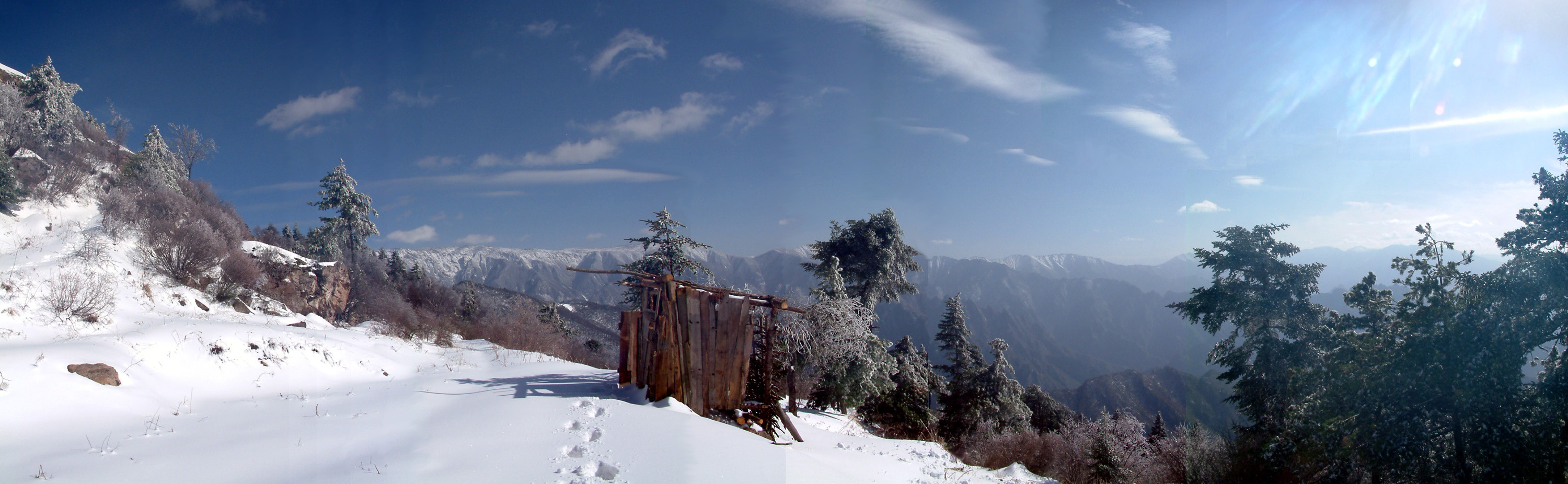
A panorama in the heart of Taibai (with small hut in the center), taken from Doumu Palace, elev. 2900m.

== See also ==
- Aotai trail
- List of ultras of Tibet, East Asia and neighbouring areas
