= Baotianman National Nature Reserve =

Nature reserve in Henan, China

- IUCN category V (protected landscape/seascape)
- Location within China
- Location: Henan, China
- Nearest city: Nanyang
- Coordinates: 33°29′44″N 111°56′24″E
- Area: 54.13 km^{2} (20.90 sq mi)

The Baotianman National Nature Reserve (Chinese: 宝天曼国家级自然保护区) is located in Nanyang, Henan, in central China. It is embedded in the much larger (909.5 km²) Baotianman UNESCO-MAB Biosphere Reserve.

== Description ==
The Baotianman National Nature Reserve is the most well-preserved natural broad-leaved forest area in east China. It represents the transition zone between warm temperate zone and subtropical zone.

The reserve includes Pteroceltis tatarinowii forest that supports 171 plant species of 131 genera and 68 families.

== Baotianman Forest Dynamics Plot ==
The reserve includes the 25-ha Baotianman Forest Dynamics Plot established in 2009 as part of the Center for Tropical Forest Science consortium. Animal life on the plot is monitored using camera traps. The most frequently recorded mammals were wild boars, Père David's rock squirrels, Swinhoe's striped squirrels, rats of genus Niviventer, Malayan porcupines, hog badgers, and Reeves's muntjacs. Common birds recorded were koklass pheasants, Eurasian jays, and Eurasian nuthatches.

== See also ==
- Baotianmansaurus
