= Honghe National Nature Reserve =

Nature reserve in Heilongjiang, China

- Location within China
- Location: Heilongjiang Province, China
- Coordinates: 47.757°N 133.695°E
- Area: 218.35 km^{2} (84.31 sq mi)
- Established: 1984

Ramsar Wetland
- Designated: 11 January 2002
- Reference no.: 1149

The Honghe National Nature Reserve (HNNR) is a 218.35-square-kilometre (84.31 sq mi) Ramsar Convention-designated site in Heilongjiang Province in northeastern China. It was first established in 1984 as a provincial wetland reserve, and was upgraded to be a national nature reserve in 1996. 173 birds are known from the Reserve including protected species such as black stork, black-billed capercaillie, greater spotted eagle, the Kamchatkan or Steller's sea eagle, mandarin duck, Oriental white stork, red-crowned crane, white-naped crane, white-tailed sea eagle, and whooper swan.

== Ecological status ==
Zhou, et al. (2009) conducted a statistical analysis using historical survey data to study marsh degradation and changes in the hydrological regime from both natural and human impacts and concluded strategies are urgently needed to maintain sustainable economic benefits while preserving this nature reserve.
