= Liancheng National Nature Reserve =

Nature reserve in the Yellow River Basin, Gansu, China

- Location within China
- Location: Gansu Province, China
- Coordinates: 36°49′30″N 102°46′48″E
- Area: 47,930 ha (118,400 acres)

Liancheng National Nature Reserve is located in Gansu Province in the Yellow River Basin. It consists of 47,930 hectares (118,400 acres), of which 14,223 ha (35,150 acres) is core area, 13,189 ha (32,590 acres) is buffer area, and the remaining 20,517 ha (50,700 acres) is experimental area mainly targeted for the protection of the spruce ecosystem, especially Picea wilsonii.

The reserve is located approximately between 36°33' and 36°48' North latitude, and between 102°36' and 102°55' East longitude.

The climate is temperate continental monsoon, the annual average rainfall is 419 cm per square meter.

== Bibliography ==
- 关于发布河北柳江盆地地质遗迹等17处新建国家级自然保护区面积、范围及功能分区等有关事项的通知 ("Notice of the scope and function of the 17 new state-level nature reserve areas, such as the Liujiang River Basin Geologic Relic National Nature Reserve in Hebei" Central Letter 314 (2005), State Environmental Protection Administration) in Chinese
