= Changqing National Nature Reserve =

Nature reserve in Shaanxi, China

- 长青自然保护区
- IUCN category V (protected landscape/seascape)
- Location within China
- Location: Shaanxi, China
- Coordinates: 33.649°N 107.618°E
- Area: 300 km^{2} (120 mi^{2})
- Established: 1995

Changqing National Nature Reserve (simplified Chinese: 长青自然保护区; traditional Chinese: 長青自然保護區; pinyin: Chángqīng Zìránbǎohùqū) is located near Huayang Village in the Qin Mountains of Shaanxi province of China.

- Location: 300 km (190 mi) south of Xi'an
- Area: 300 km^{2} (120 mi^{2})
- Highest point: 3,071 m (10,075 ft)
- Year established: 1995

== Flora and fauna ==
- Crested ibis, Nipponia nippon
- Qinling panda, Ailuropoda melanoleuca qinlingensis
- Golden monkey, Rhinopithecus roxellanae
- Golden takin, Budorcas taxicolor bedfordi
- 31 species of threatened plants

Research has shown that this reserve used to be the largest panda habitat in the world.
