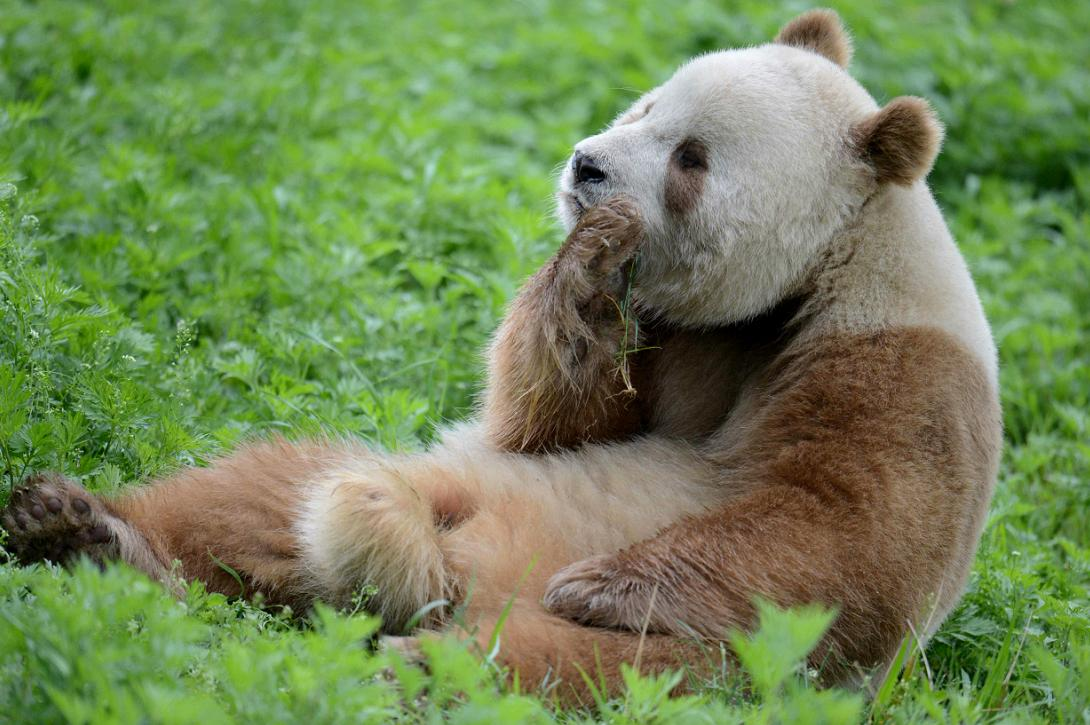
- Qi Zai, the only brown panda in captivity, born c. 2009

Scientific classification
- Kingdom: Animalia
- Phylum: Chordata
- Class: Mammalia
- Order: Carnivora
- Family: Ursidae
- Genus: Ailuropoda
- Species: A. melanoleuca
- Subspecies: A. m. qinlingensis

Trinomial name
- Ailuropoda melanoleuca qinlingensis Wan, Wu & Fang, 2005

= Qinling panda =

Subspecies of the giant panda

The Qinling panda (Ailuropoda melanoleuca qinlingensis), also known as the brown panda, is a subspecies of the giant panda, discovered on November 15, 1959, but not recognized as a subspecies until June 30, 2005. Besides the nominate subspecies, it is the first giant panda subspecies to be recognized. There are estimated to be 200 to 300 Qinling pandas remaining. Most Qinling pandas are black and white, but a small number of brown and white pandas have been discovered, with Qi Zai being the only one in captivity.

== Characteristics ==
It differs from the more familiar nominate subspecies by its smaller skull, larger teeth and larger overall size. Brown pandas are exceedingly rare even within the subspecies.

Most Qinling pandas are around the same size as giant pandas, growing to 1.2–1.8 m (3 ft 11 in – 5 ft 11 in) in length and 70–80 cm (28–31 in) at shoulder height. The males of the species are heavier than females, weighing roughly 60–190 kg (130–420 lb) whereas females are likely to weigh 75–125 kg (165–276 lb).

Qinling panda
- Traditional Chinese: 秦嶺熊貓
- Simplified Chinese: 秦岭熊猫
Transcriptions
Standard Mandarin
- Hanyu Pinyin: qínlǐng xióngmāo

== Distribution and habitat ==
This subspecies is restricted to the Qinling Mountains, at elevations of 1,300–3,000 metres (4,300–9,800 ft). The higher incidence of brown coloration is possibly a consequence of inbreeding: as the population is closed off from genetic variation and this might have led to the preservation of the mutation responsible.

== Conservation and threats ==
There are an estimated 200–300 Qinling pandas living in the wild as of 2023, up from 100 in 2001.

Due to the Qinling subspecies being restricted in range, it has been exposed to metal intoxicates such as copper, nickel, lead, and zinc that are now present in bamboo and soil as a result of the environmental pollution that is ongoing in China. More specifically, studies have indicated that the Qinling subspecies faces such anthropogenic threats so directly due to the fact that heavy concentrations of metals in bamboo and soil are positively correlated with high elevations, thus the Qinling Mountain range is increasingly affected.

Dental health is important for the survival of the Qinling pandas. These pandas have a survival rate of 5–20 years. The reliance on bamboo while having a carnivore digestive system results in energy and nutritional challenges and affects the oral health of these pandas. They feed on bamboo for at least 14 hours a day, which causes their teeth to wear out. The most common dental abnormalities that Qinling pandas face are dental attrition and fractures. These two abnormalities can impact the survival rate of these pandas.

== Feeding behaviors ==
In a field study, pandas in the Qinling Mountains were observed demonstrating a dietary strategy to maximize protein intake and minimize fiber consumption, further mirroring the macronutrient profiles of hypercarnivores. This approach may have facilitated the dietary transition of giant pandas by isolating the evolution of diet from more complex physiological adaptations, such as gut length and microbial composition, though it also raises questions about the evolutionary pressures that have shaped these adaptations.
