= Qinling =

Mountain range in Shaanxi, China

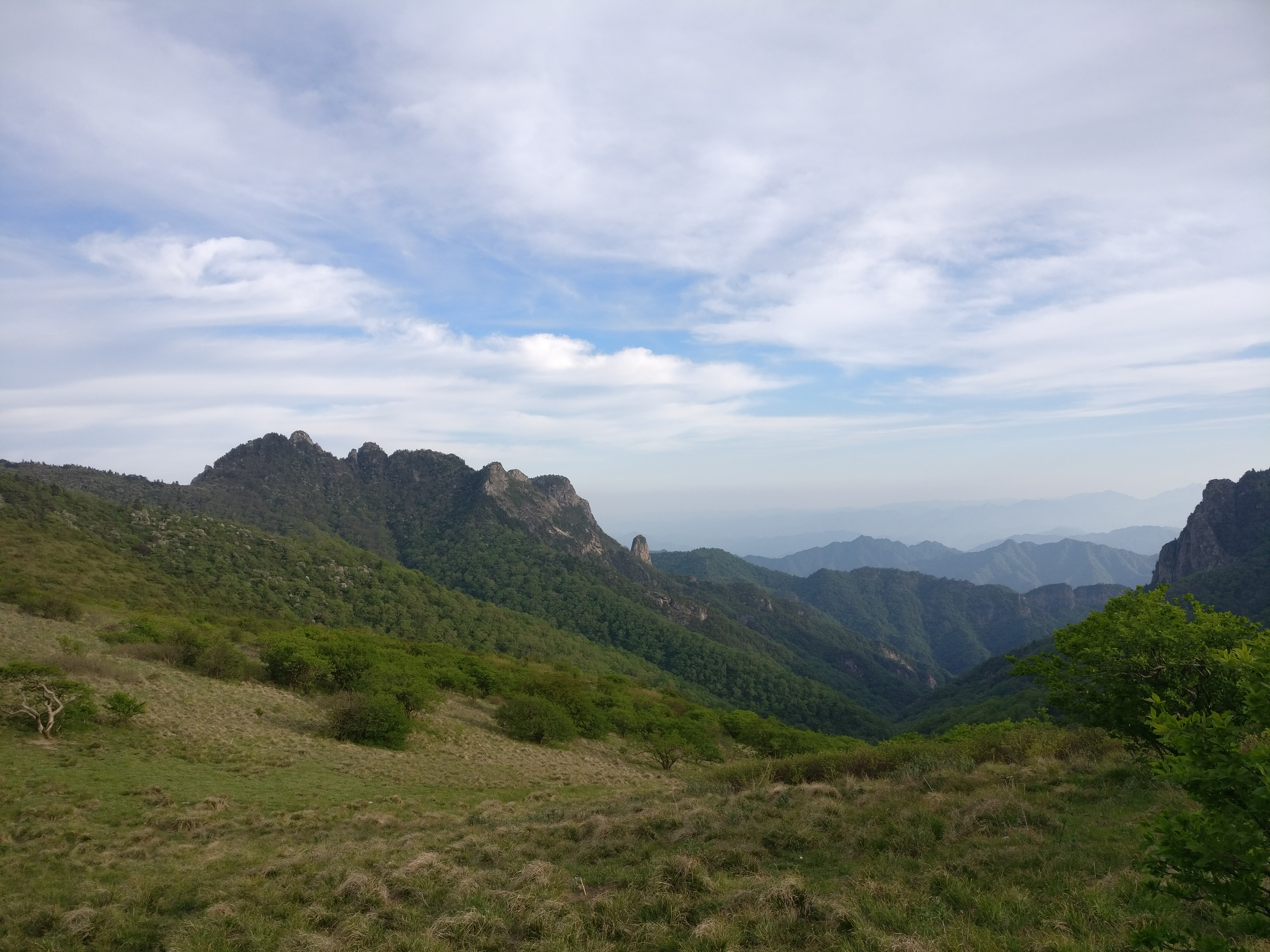

Highest point
- Peak: Mount Taibai
- Elevation: 3,767 m (12,359 ft)
- Coordinates: 33°57′48″N 107°37′05″E

Naming
- Language of name

Chinese name
- Traditional Chinese: 秦嶺
- Simplified Chinese: 秦岭
- Literal meaning: Qin Peak(s)
Transcriptions
Standard Mandarin
- Hanyu Pinyin: Qínlǐng
- Wade–Giles: Chʻin^{2} Ling^{3}

Former name is the Southern Mountains
- Chinese: 南山
Transcriptions
Standard Mandarin
- Hanyu Pinyin: Nánshān
- Wade–Giles: Nan-shan

Geography
- Location within Northern China Location within China
- Country: China
- Region: Southern Shaanxi Province

The Qinling (simplified Chinese: 秦岭; traditional Chinese: 秦嶺; pinyin: Qínlǐng) or Qin Mountains, formerly known as the Nanshan ("Southern Mountains"), are a major east–west mountain range in southern Shaanxi Province, China. The mountains mark the divide between the drainage basins of the Yangtze and Yellow River systems, providing a natural boundary between North and South China and support a huge variety of plant and wildlife, some of which is found nowhere else on earth.

To the north is the densely populated Wei River valley, an ancient center of Chinese civilization. To the south is the Han River valley. To the west is the line of mountains along the northern edge of the Tibetan Plateau. To the east are the lower Funiu and Daba Mountains, which rise out of the coastal plain.

The northern side of the range is prone to hot weather, the rain shadow cast by the physical barrier of the mountains dictating that the land to the north has a semi-arid climate, and is consequently somewhat impoverished in regard to fertility and species diversity. Furthermore, the mountains have also acted in the past as a natural defense against nomadic invasions from the north, as only four passes cross the mountains. In the late 1990s a railway tunnel and a spiral were completed, thereby easing travel across the range.

The highest mountain in the range is Mount Taibai at 3,767 meters (12,359 ft), which is about 100 kilometers (62 mi) west of the ancient Chinese capital of Xi'an. Three culturally significant peaks in the range are Mount Hua (2,155 meters or 7,070 feet), Mount Li (1,302 meters or 4,272 feet), and Mount Maiji (1,742 meters or 5,715 feet).

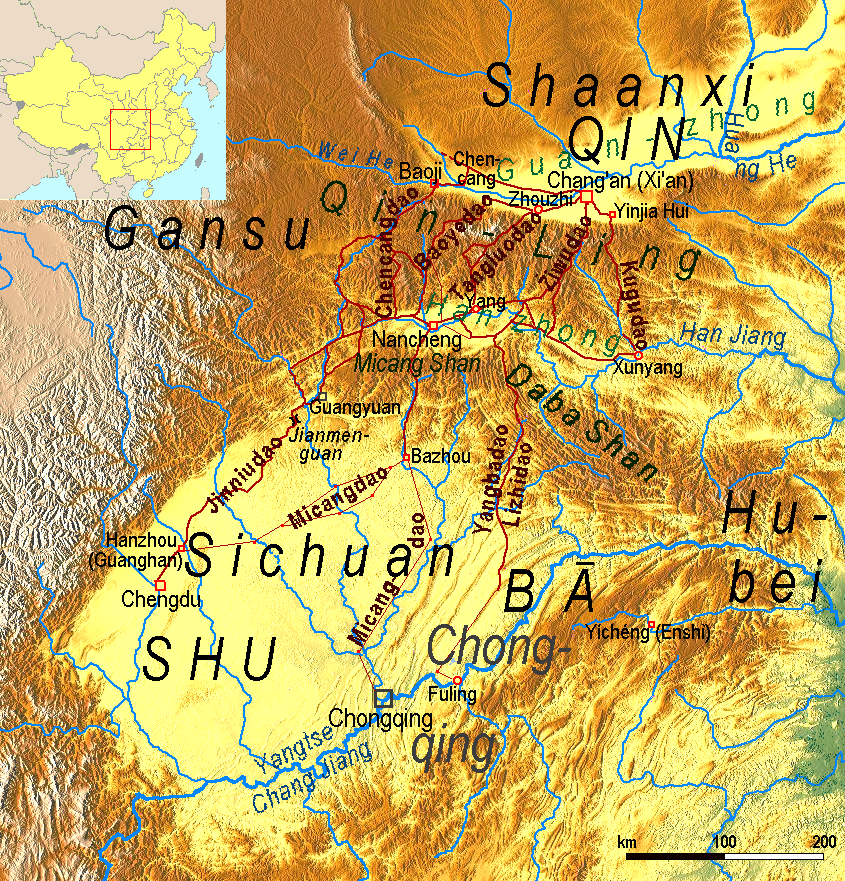
Detailed view of various mountain ranges and passes between Shaanxi and Sichuan

== Environment, flora and fauna ==
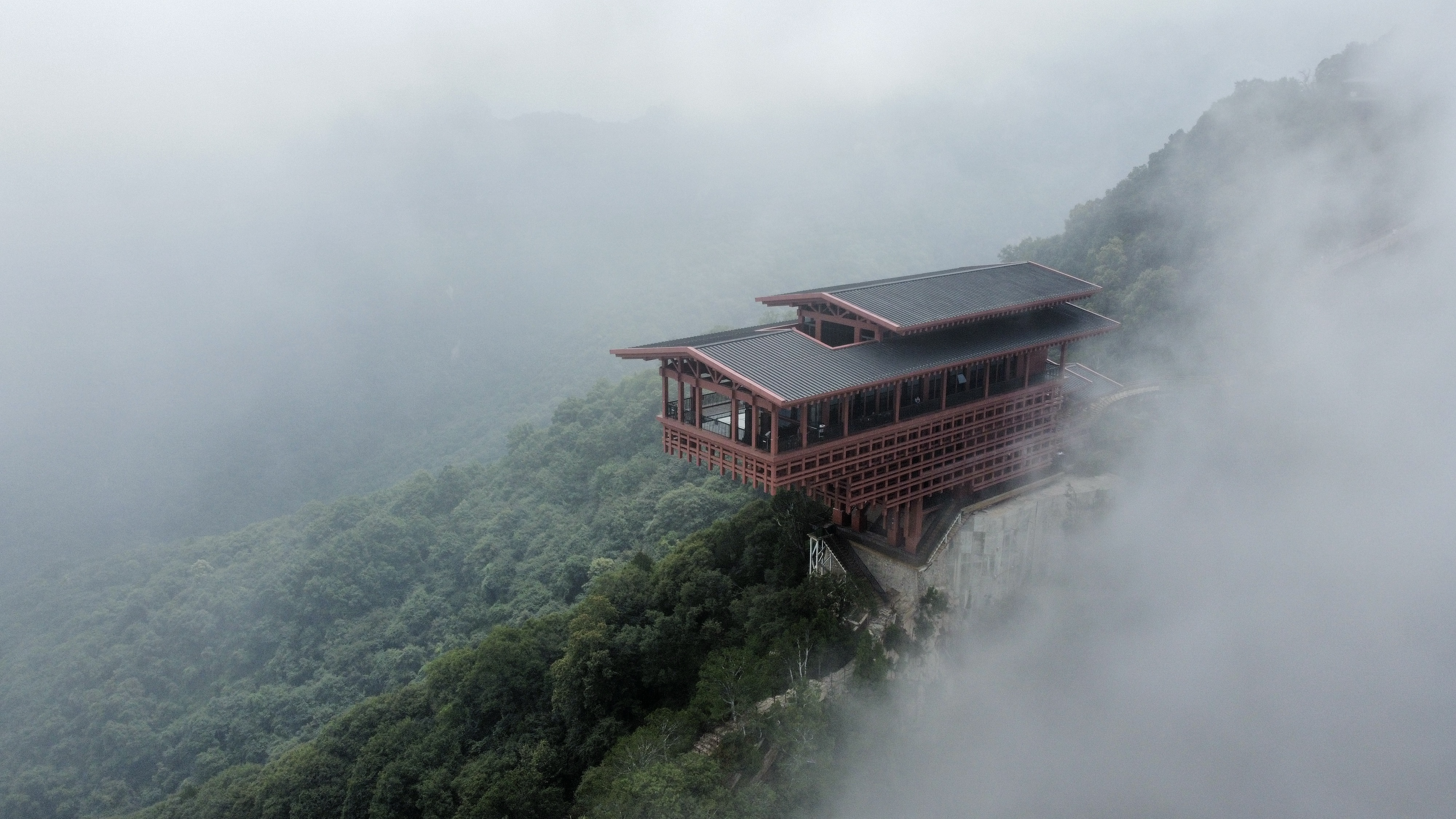
Mount Shaohua

The environment of the Qin Mountains is a deciduous forest ecoregion.

The Qin Mountains form the watershed of the Yellow River and Yangtze River basins; historically, the former was home to deciduous broadleaf forests, while the latter has milder winters with more rainfall, and was generally covered in warmer, temperate, evergreen broadleaf forests. Thus, the Qin Mountains are commonly used as the demarcation line between northern and southern China.

The low-elevation forests of the Qin foothills are dominated by temperate deciduous trees, like oaks (Quercus acutissima, Q. variabilis), elm (Ulmus spp.), common walnut (Juglans regia), maple (Acer spp.), ash (Fraxinus spp.) and Celtis spp. Evergreen species of these low-elevation forests include broadleaf chinquapins (Castanopsis sclerophylla), ring-cupped oaks (Quercus glauca), and conifers, like Pinus massoniana.

At the middle elevations, conifers, like Pinus armandii, are mixed with broadleaf birch (Betula spp.), oaks (Quercus spp.), and hornbeams (Carpinus spp.); from about 2,600 to 3,000 meters (8,500 to 9,800 ft), these mid-elevation forests give way to a subalpine forest of firs (Abies fargesii, A. chensiensis), Cunninghamia, and birch (Betula spp.), with rhododendrons (Rhododendron fastigiatum) abundant in the understory.

The region is home to a large number of rare plants, of which around 3,000 have been documented. Plant and tree species native to the region include ginkgo (Ginkgo biloba—thought to be one of the oldest species of tree in the world), as well as Huashan or Armand pine (Pinus armandii), Huashan shen (Physochlaina infundibularis), Acer miaotaiense and Chinese fir. Timber harvesting reached a peak in the 18th century in the Qinling Mountains.

The region is home to the endemic Qinling panda (Ailuropoda melanoleuca qinlingensis), a brown-and-white subspecies of the giant panda (A. melanoleuca), which is protected with the help of the Changqing and Foping nature reserves. An estimated 250 to 280 pandas live in the region, which is thought to represent around one-fifth of the entire wild giant panda population. The Qinling Mountains are also home to many other species of wildlife, including numerous birds, like the crested ibis, Temminck's tragopan, golden eagle, black throat and golden pheasants, as well as mammals like the Asiatic golden cat, Asiatic black bear, clouded leopard, golden takin, golden snub-nosed monkey, yellow-throated marten, and leopard.

The Chinese giant salamander (Andrias davidianus), at 1.8 meters (5 ft 11 in), is one of the largest amphibians in the world, and is critically endangered; it is locally pursued for food, and for use of its body parts in traditional Chinese medicine. An environmental education program is being undertaken to encourage sustainable management of wild populations in the Qin Mountains, and captive-breeding programs have also been set up.

== Weapons of mass destruction ==
According to the US-based think tank Nuclear Information Project, China "keeps most of its nuclear warheads at a central storage facility in the Qinling mountain range, though some are kept at smaller regional storage facilities."

== See also ==
- Gallery road
- Huaqing Pool
- Qinling Orogenic Belt
- Qinling panda
