= Hanyuan =

Hanyuan may refer to:

- Hanyuan County, in Sichuan, China
- Hancheng, Shaanxi, formerly known as Hanyuan, a city in Shaanxi, China
