= Vernacular residential architecture of Western Sichuan =

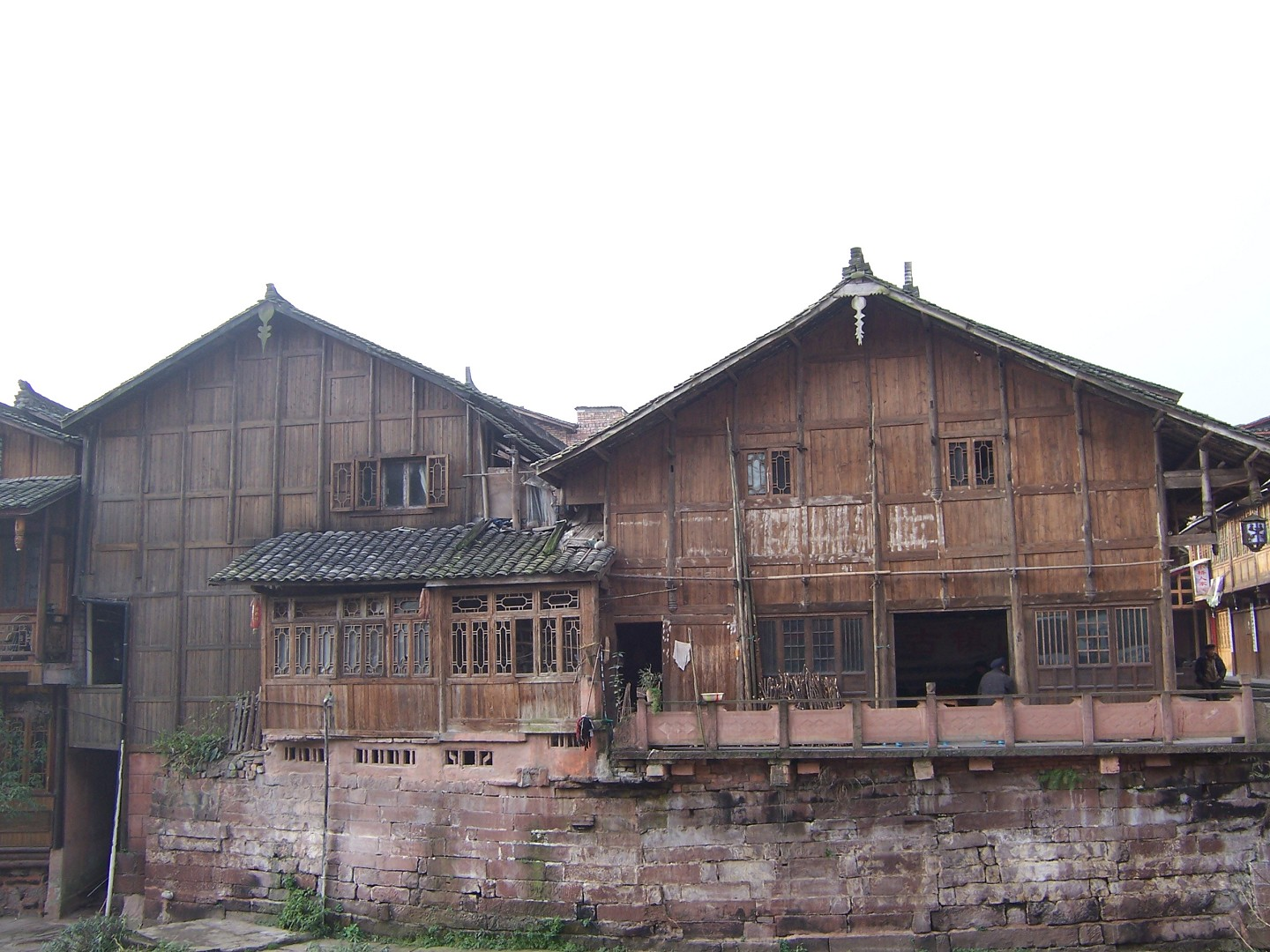
Residential architecture in Shangli Town

The vernacular residential architecture of Western Sichuan is one kind of Sichuan vernacular architecture styles in Sichuan, China. Those vernacular residential areas are located with a densely populated plain with rivers in the west of the Longquan Mountains in Sichuan basin and centered on Chengdu.

== Background ==
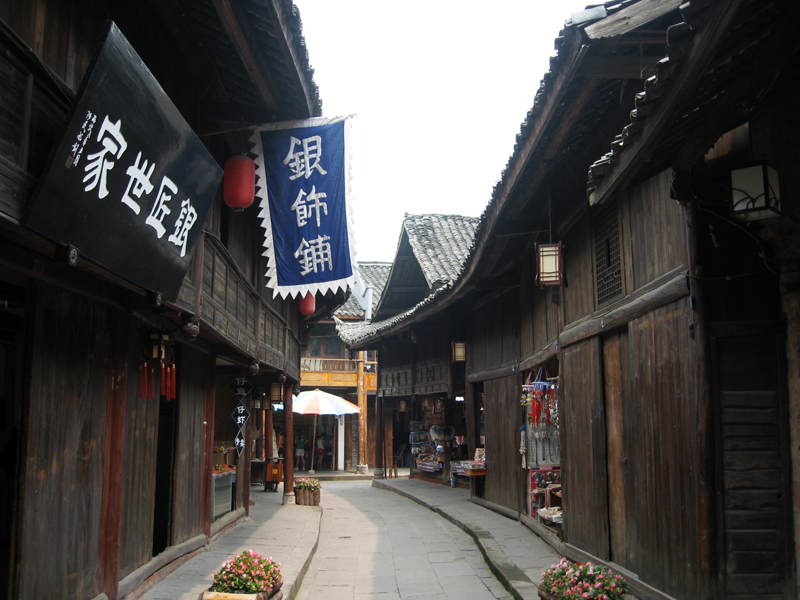
Lane of Huanglongxi

Western Sichuan, known as Chuanxi in Chinese (Chinese: 川西; pinyin: Chuānxī), refers to the western plain of Sichuan and is located in the western part of the Sichuan Basin. It is also called as Chengdu Plain or Basin West Plain. The narrow western Sichuan plain refers to the alluvial plains with an area of approximately 8,000 square metres (2.0 acres) of Min River, Tuo River, and their tributaries bordered by Dujiangyan City, Mianzhu, Luojiang, Jintang, Xinjin and Qionglai.

Vernacular residential architecture style in Western Sichuan became relatively mature in Qing dynasty. There are several characteristics of this architecture style which help distinguish themselves from other Chinese vernacular architecture style: it has a central courtyard to organize main rooms, several small courtyards composed to improve its inner ventilation and natural lighting, a flexible layout of corridor to connect the adjacent rooms, and amiable spaces with frequent communication, etc.

=== Natural environment ===
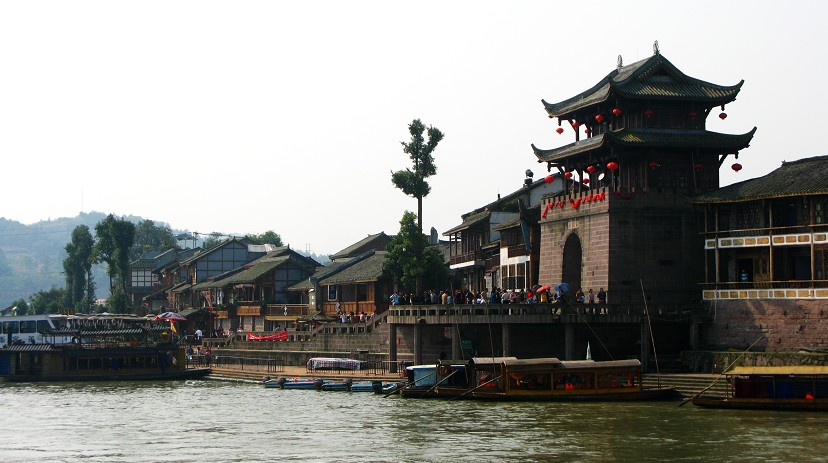

The Sichuan Basin is surrounded by mountains, with rivers and dense small hills inside. Most of the vernacular settlements are built on the hills, mountains, and near to rivers, forming a style in a picturesque disorder. The basin has less sunshine, but more rainfall and high humidity, and it attributes to a subtropical humid climate. Due to the influence of geographical location and topography, there are rare winds in the basin. Therefore, most roofs in the Sichuan Basin are thin and light. The winter climate is warmer and the summer is hotter. In some of the common settlements, the construction ways of pavilions and halls are also formed due to the hot and rainy climate, so as to increase the permeability of the houses and facilitate the ventilation and people's outdoor activities.

=== Migration ===
Since the Qin and Han dynasties, Sichuan's culture has gradually evolved and new external factors have been added. This has a great relationship with past immigration activities. Since the Qin defeated the Bashu, there has been a large number of immigrants to Sichuan, making the Sichuan local culture and the Central Plains' mainstream culture merge for the first time. The two times of immigration from Hunan and Guangdong at the time of the Ming and Qing Dynasties made Sichuan culture merge with a large number of cultural components and increase new vitality. On the one hand, cultures in each place are integrated with each other, making the architectural style and construction technology compatible and further developing. On the other hand, the multicultural elements of architecture coexist, which makes the basin regions have different architecture styles due to the different origins of immigrants.

=== Religion and patriarchal system ===
Sichuan has long been influenced by the Taoist culture and Taoist aesthetics. Taoism emphasizes the aesthetic interest of respecting natural laws and rules, seeks imaginary and quiet aesthetic mindsets, advocates simplicity, admires freedom, and prefers to live the mountains away from the hustle and the bustle. These aesthetic ideals and pursuits with rich characteristics influence the aesthetic consciousness and aesthetic taste of Sichuan people in a religious and cultural form. The unique aesthetic ideas and consciousness of Taoism have profoundly influenced all aspects of residential houses in Sichuan, and have created the unique personality and artistic style of obeying the laws of nature, simplicity and elegance. The scope of Chinese traditional architectural art has been expanded in content and form.

The layout of the vernacular residential houses also reflects the patriarchal ethical concepts and ritual-level thinking. Reflected in the architecture, it is the dedication and preference of the central axis. The courtyard is always located at the centerline, and the central axis runs through the entire building. The layout of the building is symmetrical and balanced, with a smooth and dignified outline, reflecting a rigorous and honest style. If there is more than one courtyard, it is generally developed along the central axis or vertically to the axis. The furniture in the hall of the house is symmetrically arranged along the central axis. The indoor core space is organized by screens and main seats inside. In the distribution of family members' rooms, it is strongly influenced by the Confucian ethics and morals, which advocates to distinguish between different hierarchy status.

== Characteristics ==
=== Unique regional style ===
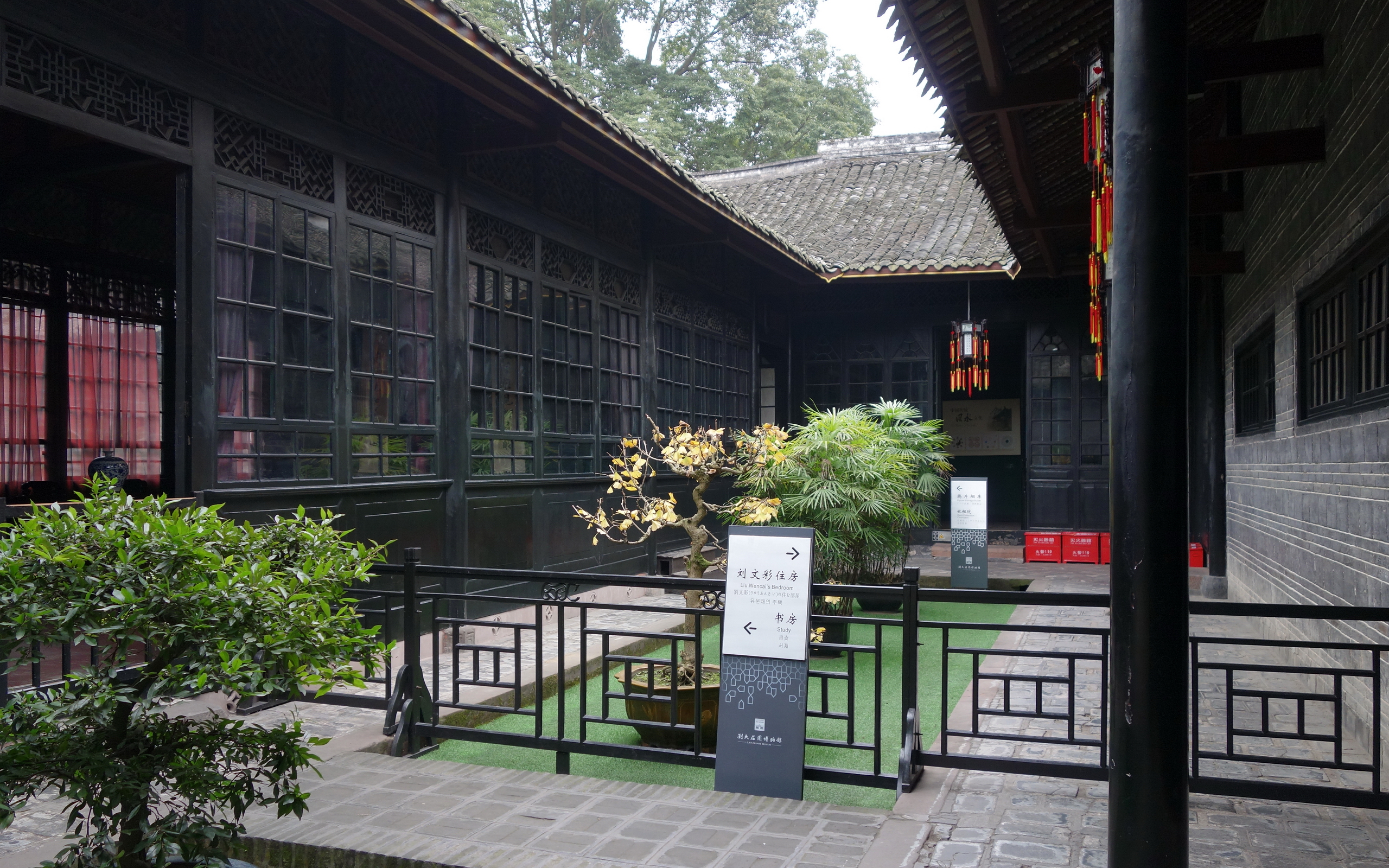
Liu Wencai residence

This feature is first reflected in the free form of the architectural plane. The vernacular residential buildings are characterized by courtyard as the main fundamental form. The basic unit of its composition is the courtyard, which is full of rooms at the four sides. The facade and the plane layout are flexible because there is no clear strict axis to meet symmetric requirements. There are often ventilated patios inside or behind the house to form a good draft. There are series of colonnades to arrange each room, deftly forming a neighborhood and a street. Second, this style shows a light and delicate aspect owing to its smaller architectural components. Also, in order to adapt to the hot and humid climate, most of the houses are wood-fenced structures, with a sloped roof and thin eaves. Third, residential houses seems simple and elegant in terms of its light architectural color. Most of the buildings are mainly in cool colors, with gray tiles, white walls, gray bricks, dark brown beams, and brown wooden doors and windows.

=== Environmental integration ===
Vernacular residential architecture in western Sichuan often reflects the Chinese principle of Harmony of Man and Nature (Chinese: 天人合一; pinyin: tiān rén hé yī). Materials used are often locally sourced, and adapted to local conditions. Common materials include wood, lime, brick, and tile, as they are believed to be harmonious with nature, and showcase nature's beauty.

=== Public spaces ===
Compact patios and wide corridors in and around the courtyard, and the corridors outside the houses, is another characteristic of the region's architecture. This serves as a communal space for inhabitants to work and live together, and to foster relationships between neighbors.

=== Strong compatibility ===
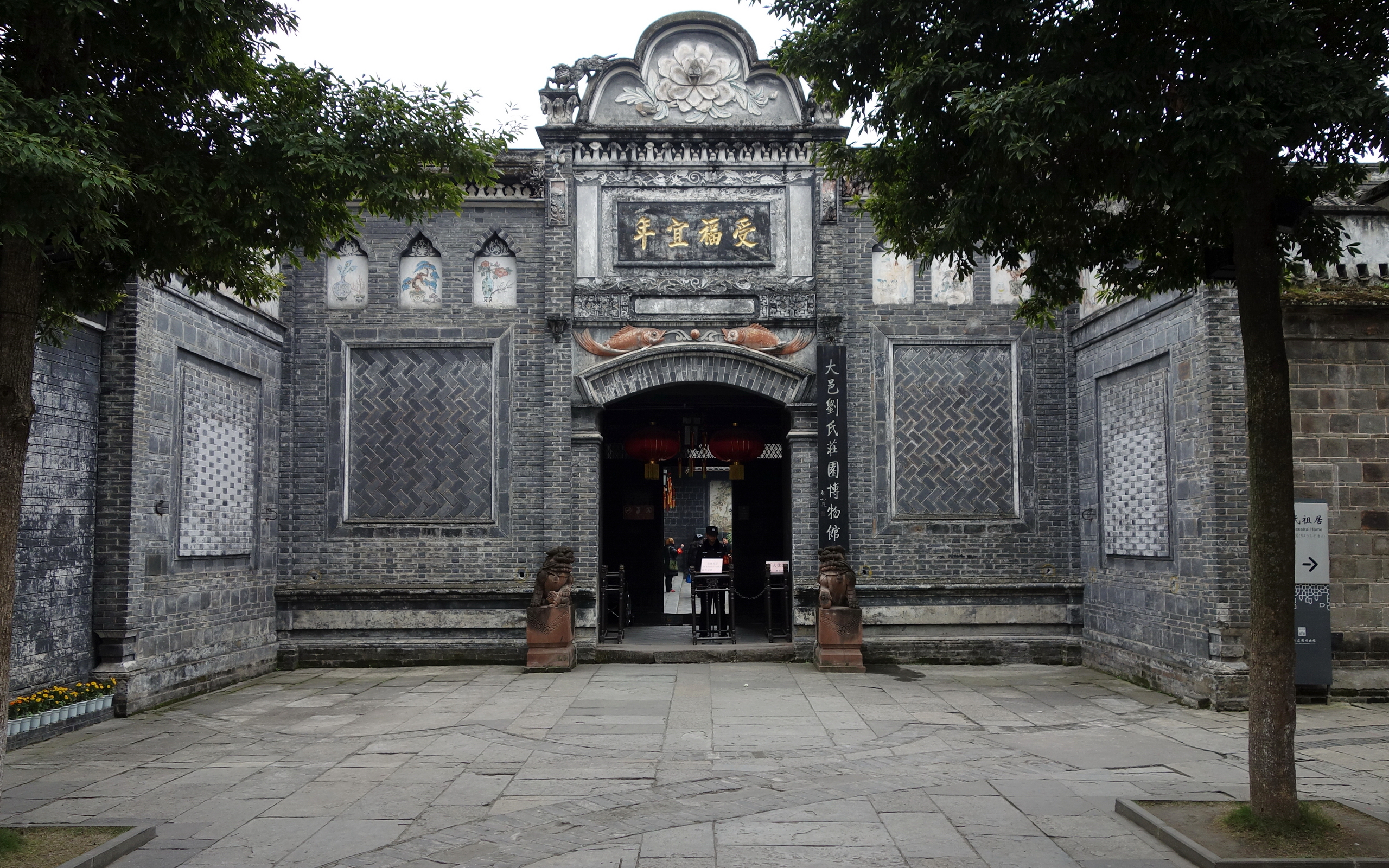
Liu's manor

Sichuan is a multi-ethnic, multi-cultural region, and historical data shows a large number of immigrants have entered Sichuan from other provinces in succession. Therefore, the residential architecture became more compatible. Its style merged the multi-culture and finally formed its own characteristic architecture style. Meanwhile, the types of residential architecture has been enriched. Vernacular residential architecture includes not only wooden farmhouses but also manors built in stone.

== Types of structures ==
=== Mansions and manors ===
Mansions and manors generally follows the basic layout of axis symmetry to reflect the family members' honorable status, but at the same time, it strives to break through this symmetry and seeks for a new form of space for the main courtyard's control to demonstrate its power and social status. These houses usually have series of courtyards, and their layout generally follows the traditional shape of "hall in front of the bedroom". Behind the house, there are gardens and affiliated courtyards.

=== Town houses ===
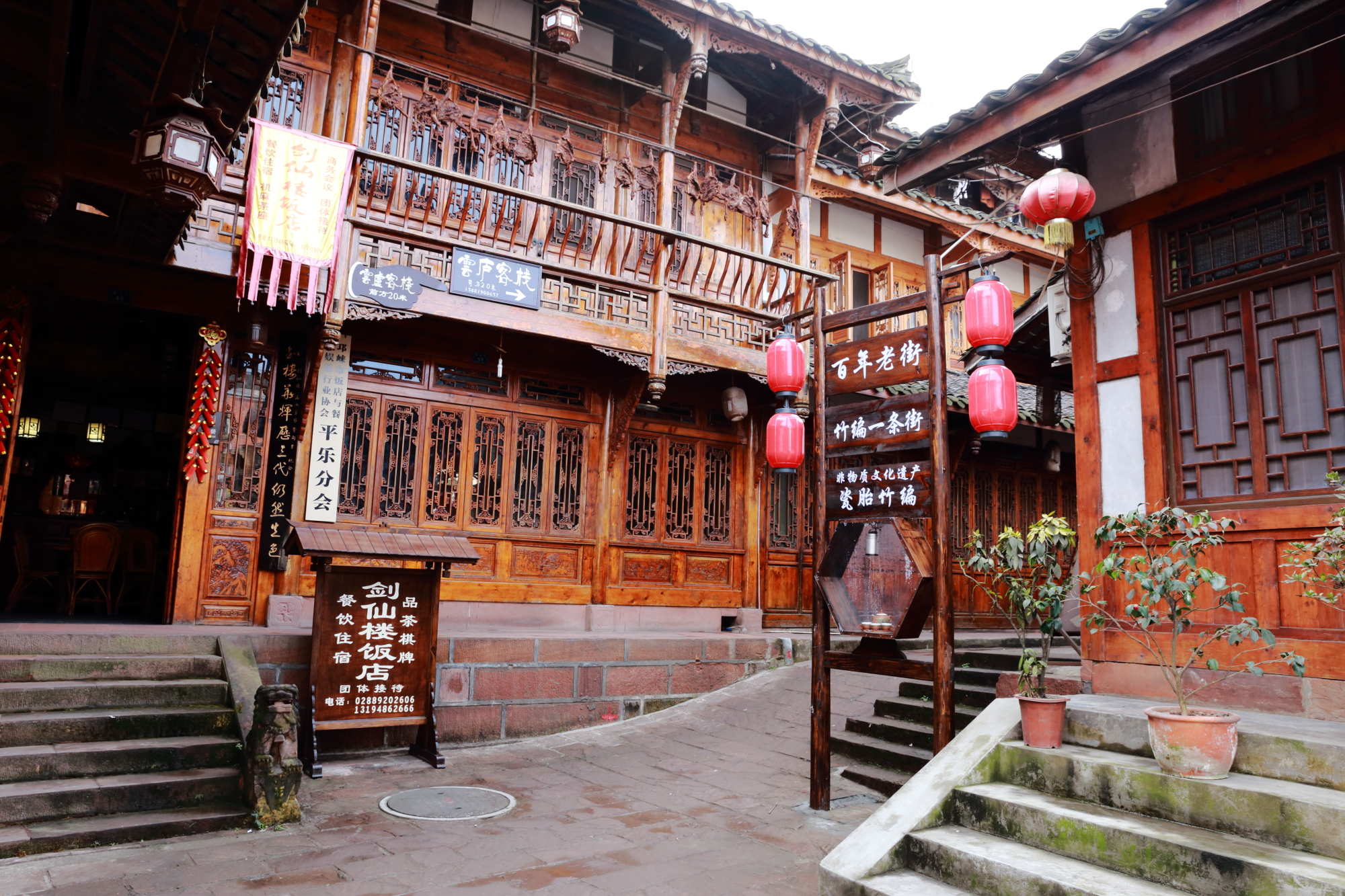
Houses in Pingle Ancient Town

Houses in western Sichuan's towns are mainly divided into two forms: a storehouse with a combination of business and residence, and a house with solely residential function. The architectural materials of this kind of houses generally use local materials such as wood, brick, gray tile, stone, etc. Architectural details such as doors, windows, and column foundations are typically intricately carved. There are also forms of multiple courtyard composition, generally appearing in the houses owned by rich class.

=== Farmhouses ===
Sichuan farmhouses are generally built near to the rivers and against mountains. There are generally two ways to select a site layout: decentralized and centralized. The decentralized site selection strives to avoid the pits. The riverside farmhouses are built on the northern bank near the water source but not so closed to the river. They are scattered and settled, one house corresponding to one household. Settlements of centralized site selection consist of one to twenty households. Around the farmhouses, trees are planted to form a quiet courtyard, thus forming a natural barrier. This not only provides a good living environment for the farmers, but also forms a unique rural landscape in the plain of western Sichuan.

The farmhouses are mostly made up of courtyards. The courtyard is mainly used as an outdoor place for agricultural activities. The building materials of the farmhouse are from local materials without being painted, fully demonstrating the texture and color of the material itself. The overall architectural features are simple and rustic.

== Modern applications ==
=== Sustainability ===
The vernacular residential architecture in western Sichuan reflects the natural concept of design and integration with nature. A 2014 paper proposed that modern architectural design in the region should incorporate principles from the region's traditional architecture, such as adjusting measures to local conditions, comprehensively considering the location and layout, preserving the original terrain, vegetation and water systems. In according with these principles, the environment should be adjusted through natural lighting and other methods suitable to the local climate in order to reduce energy consumption and achieve the symbiosis between the house and the natural environment.

=== Material sourcing ===
The vernacular residential architecture in western Sichuan uses local resources and materials. This saves resources, reduces energy consumption, reduces labor costs, reduces synthetic processing, emphasizes recycling, and decreases pollutions. A 2014 paper argues that these benefits are pertinent to modern construction.

=== Technology ===
A 2014 paper argues that the incorporation of low-tech design choice, hailing from the region's vernacular, is appropriate for construction in the Sichuan Basin.

== See also ==
- Linpan
- Vernacular architecture
