= Bifengxia =

Bifengxia 碧峰峡
- Town
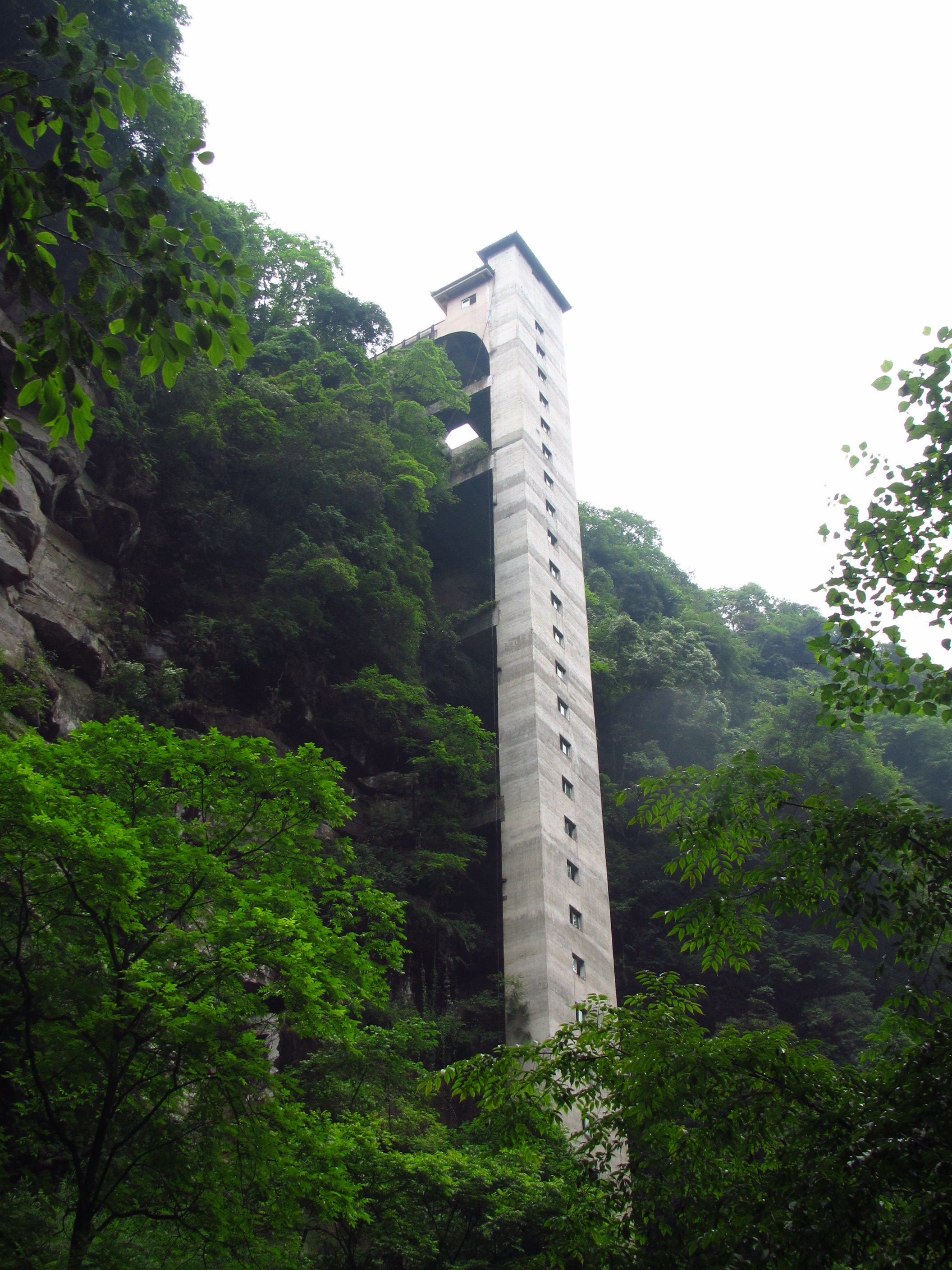
- Bifengxia (Bifeng Canyon) elevator

- Location in Sichuan
- Coordinates: 30°06′24″N 103°00′48″E
- Country: China
- Province: Sichuan
- Prefecture: Ya'an
- County: Yucheng District

Population
  - Total: 8,538

Bifengxia Town (Chinese: 碧峰峡镇; pinyin: Bìfēngxiá Zhèn; lit. 'Bluish-Green Peak Valley') is a town in Yucheng District, Ya'an, Sichuan, China. The town is located in an isolated valley, 15 km north of Ya'an city center. Its population in 2010 was 8,538. Bifengxia's main attraction is its natural-state Panda Base.

Bifengxia, meaning "Green Peak Valley", is named after the lush canyon that runs through the town just south of the Panda Base. The canyon has been developed with a concrete walking trail and is accessible via an elevator from the canyon rim.
