= Mount Erlang =

Mountain in Sichuan, China

Sichuan Mount Erlang
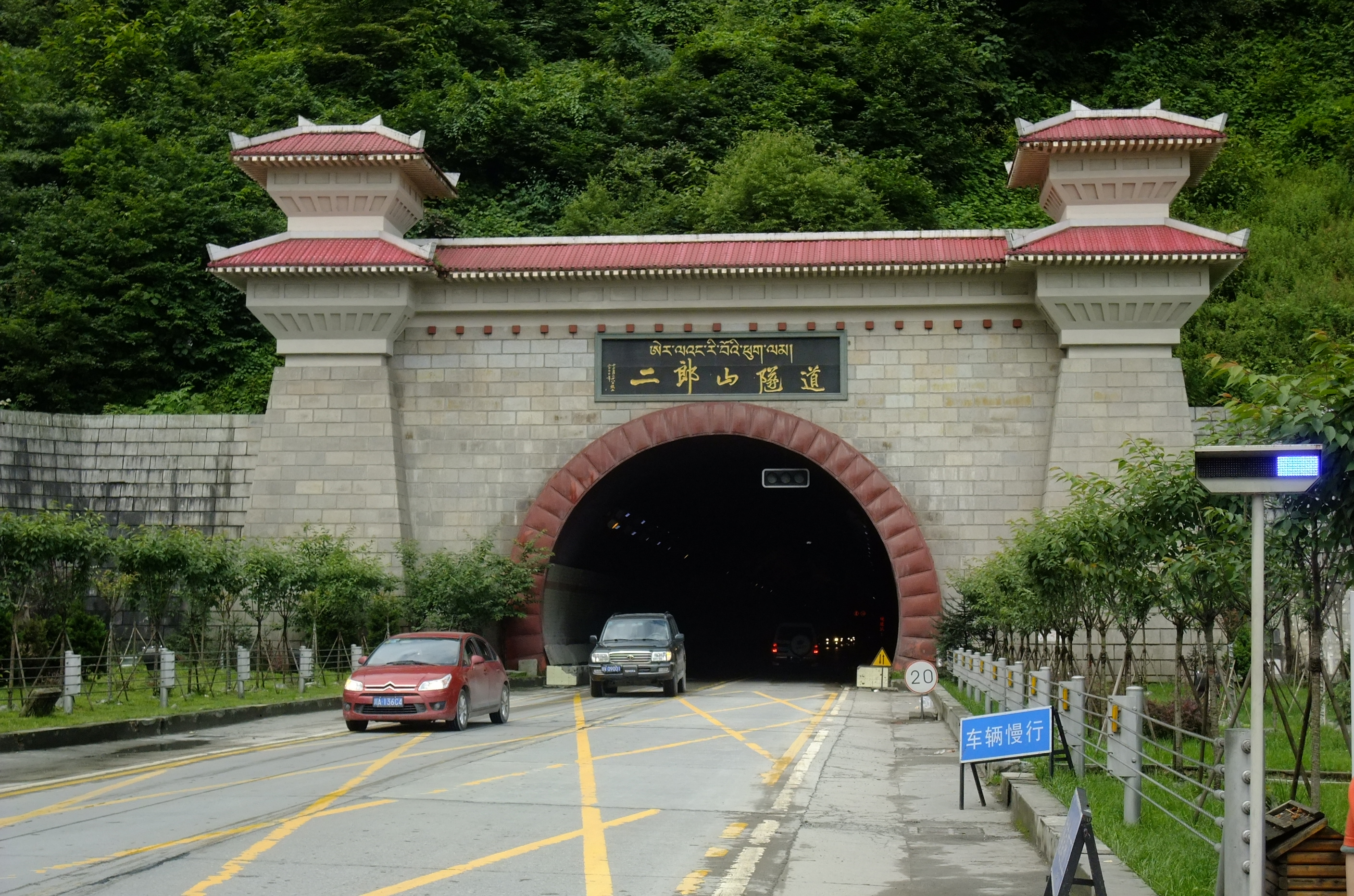

Naming
- Native name: 二郎山 (Chinese); Èrláng Shān (Chinese)

Geography
- Location: Sichuan province, China

Mount Erlang (Chinese: 二郎山; pinyin: Èrláng Shān) is a mountain in Sichuan province, China.

Located 50 kilometers west of Tianquan County, Sichuan, at an altitude of 3437 meters, and 172 kilometers away from Chengdu, it is the watershed of Qingyi River and Dadu River, which is the boundary of natural geography. The name of the mountain comes from Chinese deity Erlang Shen.

The Mount Erlang Tunnel is a road tunnel that was dug through Mount Erlang.
