= Streptomyces yaanensis =

Scientific classification
- Domain: Bacteria
- Kingdom: Bacillati
- Phylum: Actinomycetota
- Class: Actinomycetia
- Order: Streptomycetales
- Family: Streptomycetaceae
- Genus: Streptomyces
- Species: S. yaanensis

Binomial name
- Streptomyces yaanensis Zheng et al. 2013

Type strain
- CGMCC 4.7035, KCTC 29111, Z4

Species of bacterium

Streptomyces yaanensis is a bacterium species from the genus of Streptomyces which has been isolated from soil in Yaan in the Sichuan Province in China.

== See also ==
- List of Streptomyces species
