= Mount Erlang Tunnel =

Road tunnel in China

Coordinates: 29.8472°N 102.2914°E

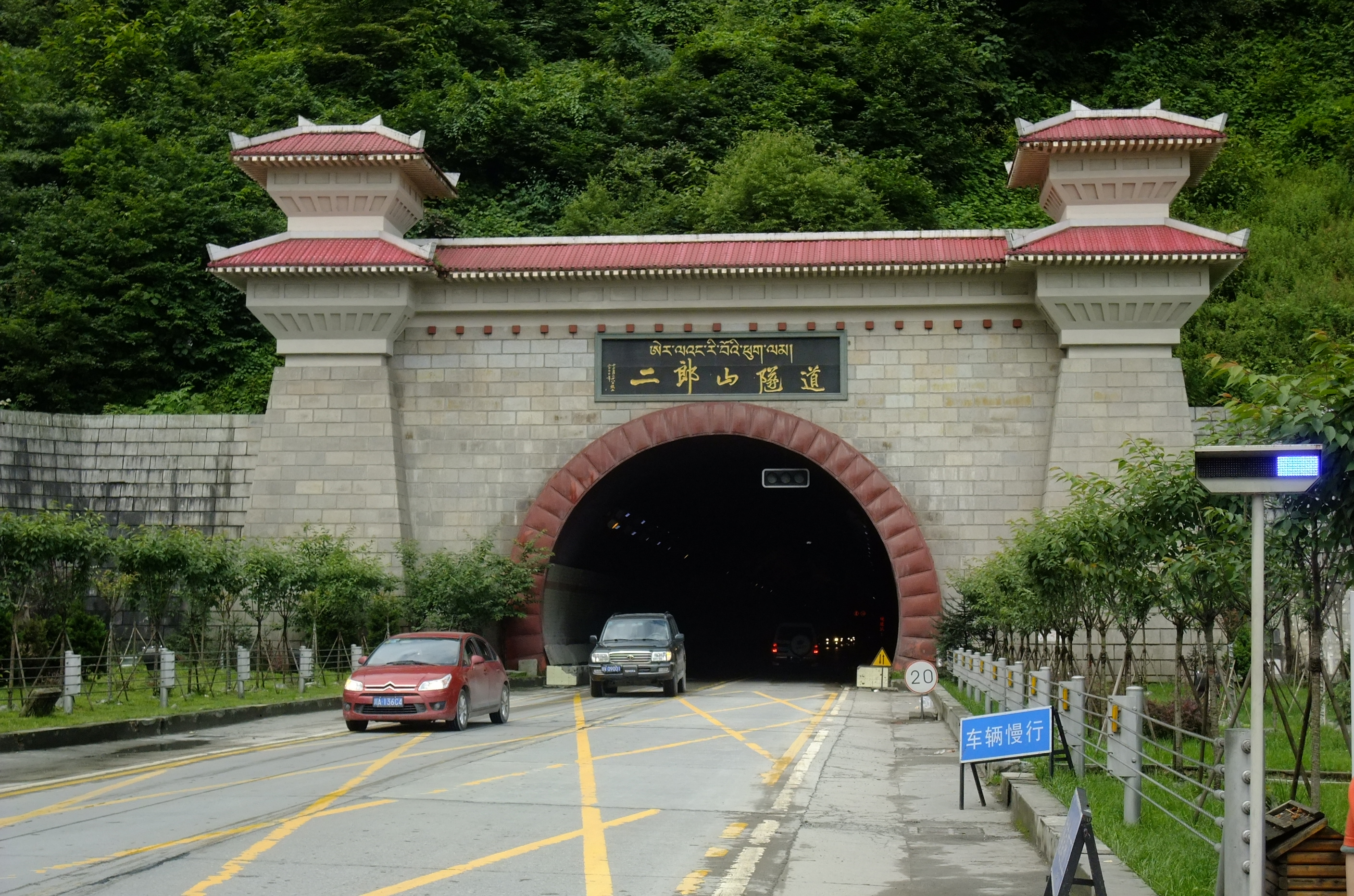
- The tunnel in 2010.

Overview
- Route: China National Highway 318

Operation
- Opened: December 8, 1999; 2018

Technical
- Length: 13,433 metres (44,071.5 ft)
- No. of lanes: 2

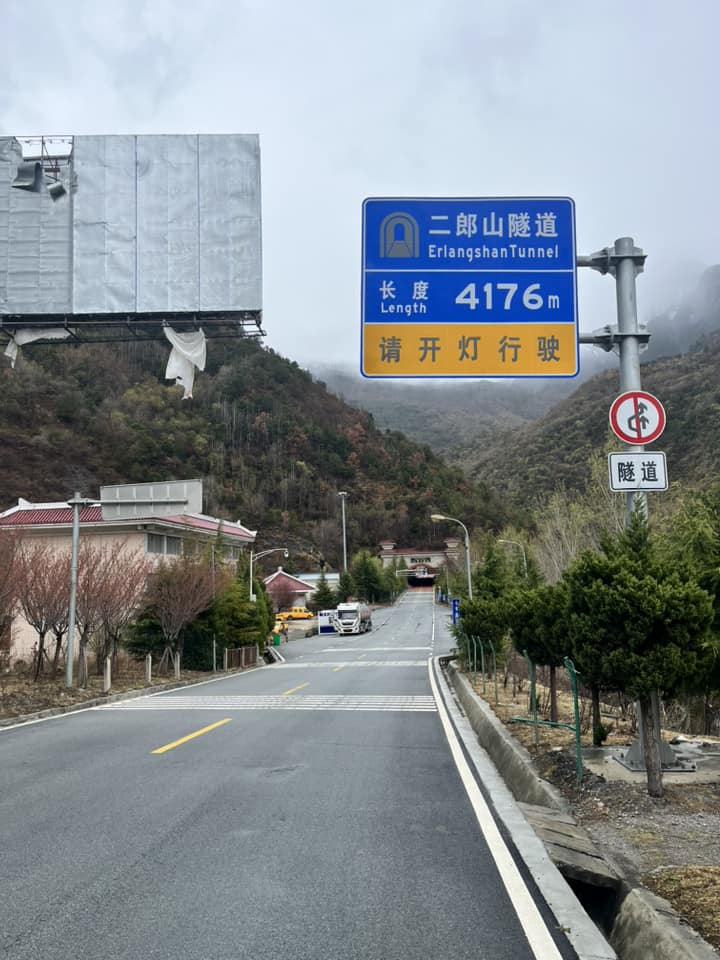
Erlangshan Tunnel Road Sign

The Mount Erlang Tunnel is a road tunnel along the Sichuan-Tibet Highway (China National Highway 318), which connects Ya'an and Garzê Tibetan Autonomous Prefecture in Sichuan Province, China. The tunnel is 4,176 meters long and was dug through Mount Erlang in Sichuan Province.

It opened on December 8, 1999. Construction took three years and cost 470 million yuan (56.6 million US dollars).

It was built to reduce time and replaces one of the most dangerous parts of the highway, which had frequent accidents because of landslides, rain and foggy weather.

== New Tunnel ==
The Erlangshan extra-long tunnel under the same mountain was completed in 2018. It is part of the Yakang Expressway and has a total length of 13 433 metres, making it the 11th longest road tunnel in the world as of 2021. The tunnel passes through several seismic fault zones and its deepest parts are 1 500 metres underground. At its western end, the tunnel links up with the Xingkang Bridge.

== See also ==
- China National Highway 318
- List of longest road tunnels
