= Gulucun Cable Car =

Tramway in Hanyuan County, Sichuan

Gulucun Cable Car 古路村索道
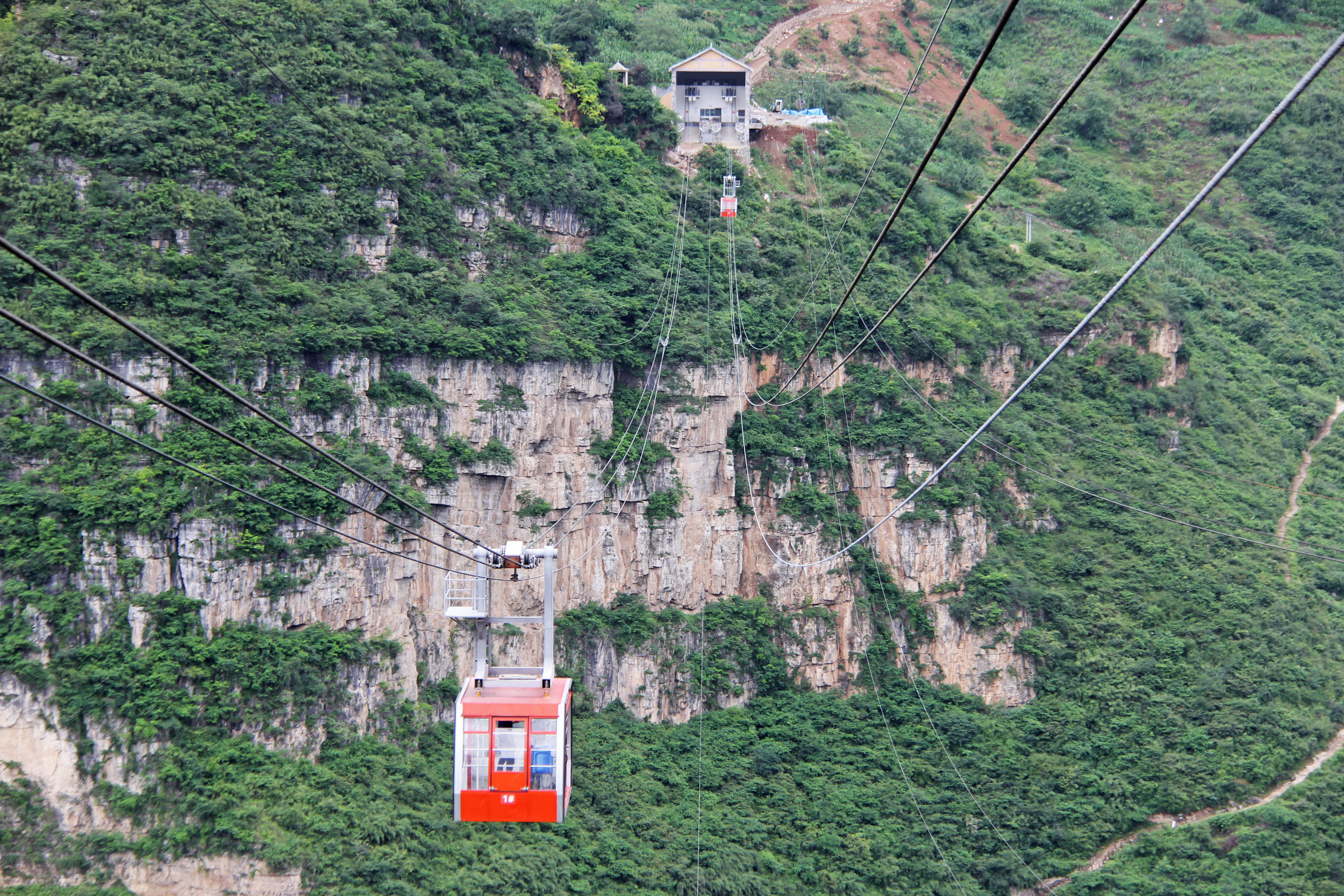
- View looking to the east station.

Overview
- Status: Operational
- Location: Hanyuan, Sichuan, China
- Termini: Mapingcun; Gulucun
- No. of stations: 2
- Open: 2017

Operation
- Trip duration: 2 min

Technical features
- Aerial lift type: Aerial tramway
- Line length: 720 m (2,360 ft)

Gulucun Cable Car is an aerial tramway connecting the two mountain villages of Gulu and Maping deep within the Dadu River Canyon in Hanyuan, Sichuan, China. The 720 metres (2,360 ft) span crosses 400 metres (1,300 ft) above Laochang Creek, one of 4 large tributaries on the north side of the Dadu River canyon.

A local 2-lane road on the Gulu side allows access to the west station while the east station can only be reached via a steep trail that rises more than 500 metres (1,600 ft) from the Dadu River level to the village of Maping. Prior to the completion of the cable car in 2017, villagers used a simple ropeway with a small steel cage to transfer animals and other cargo goods across the Laochang gorge. For 2019 there are plans to open the Gulucun Cable Car to tourists.

The east Maping station is 40 metres (130 ft) higher in elevation then the west station. The tramway car reaches a height of 400 metres (1,300 ft) above the creek making it the second highest passenger tramway in the world along with the Kitzbühel 3S Cable Car in Austria and just behind the 436-metre (1,430 ft) high Peak 2 Peak Gondola in Whistler, British Columbia, Canada. The nearby Dadu River elevation is 480 meters (1,570 ft) below the cable car elevation.

The mouth of the Laochang creek is crossed by the famous Yixiantian stone railway bridge.

== Gallery ==
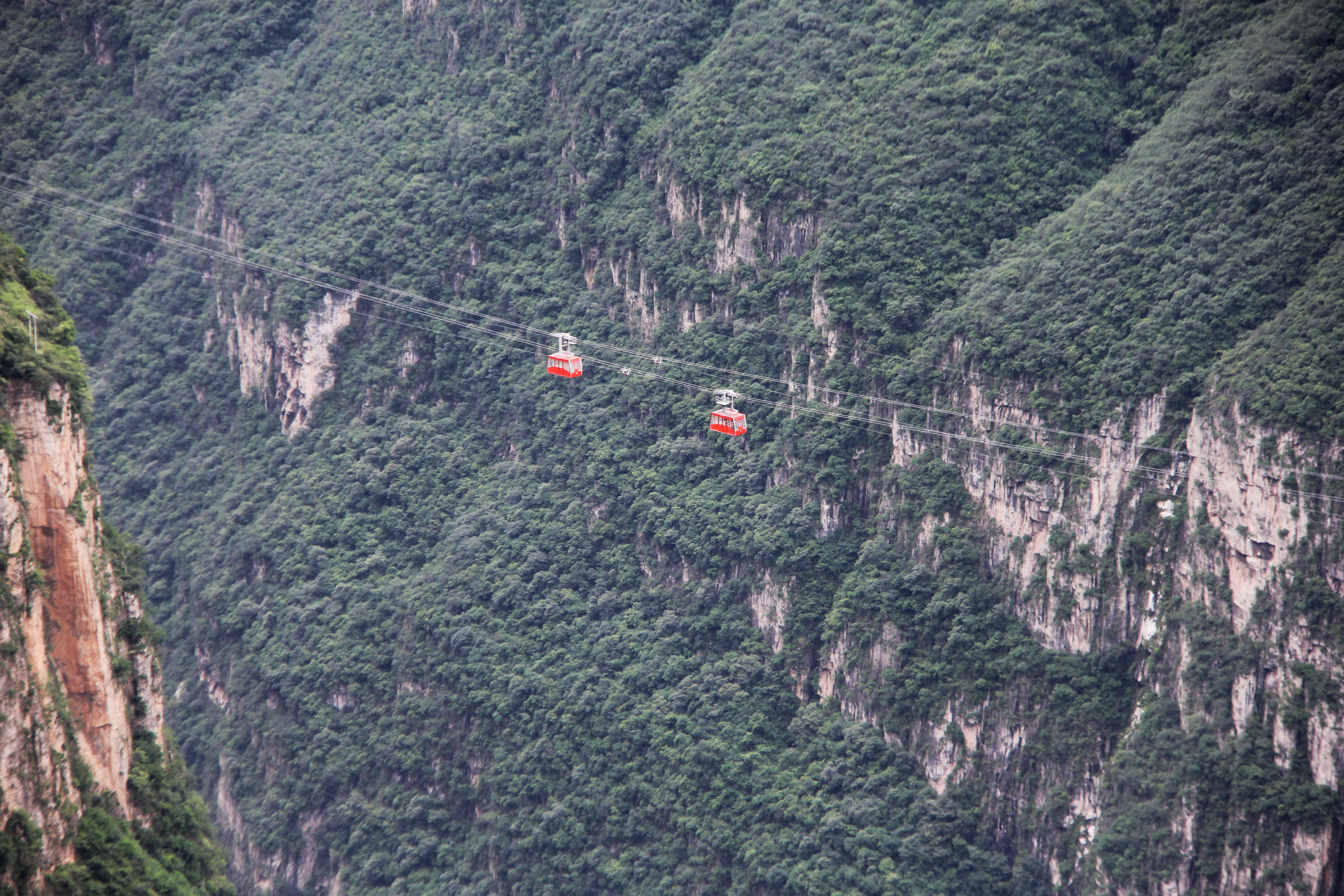
Gulucun Cable Cars within the Dadu River Canyon.

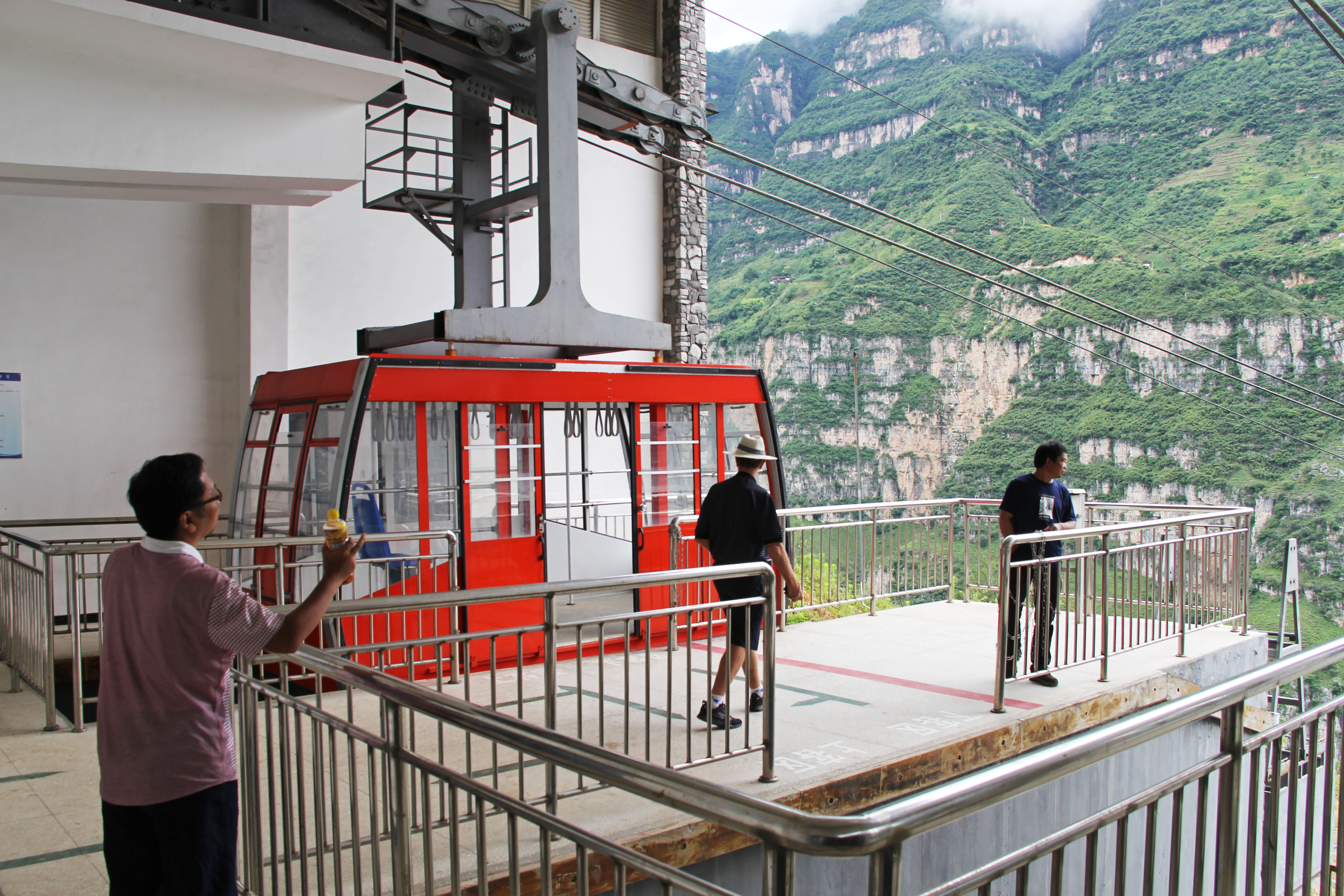
Cable car inside the west station.

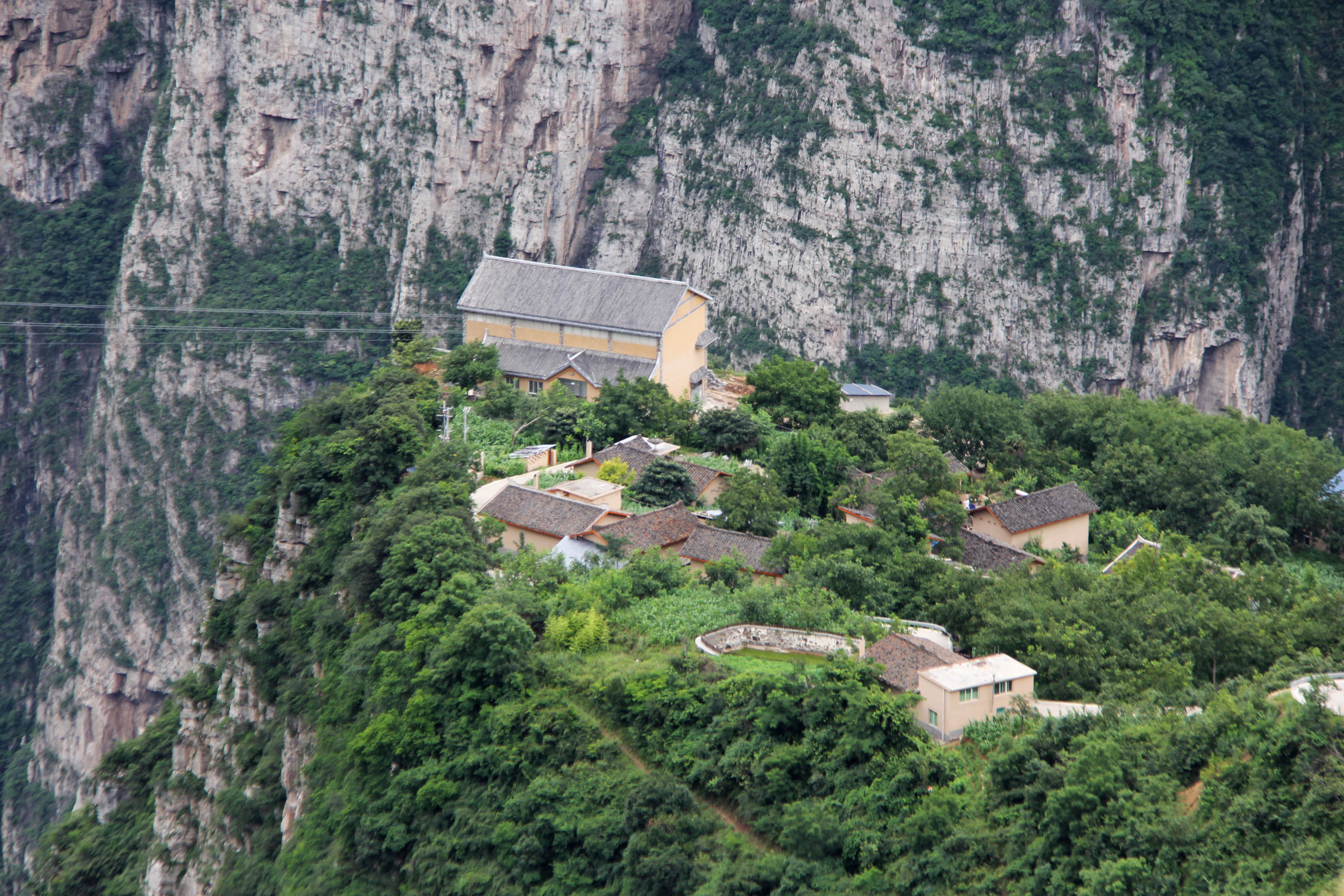
West Gulucun station.

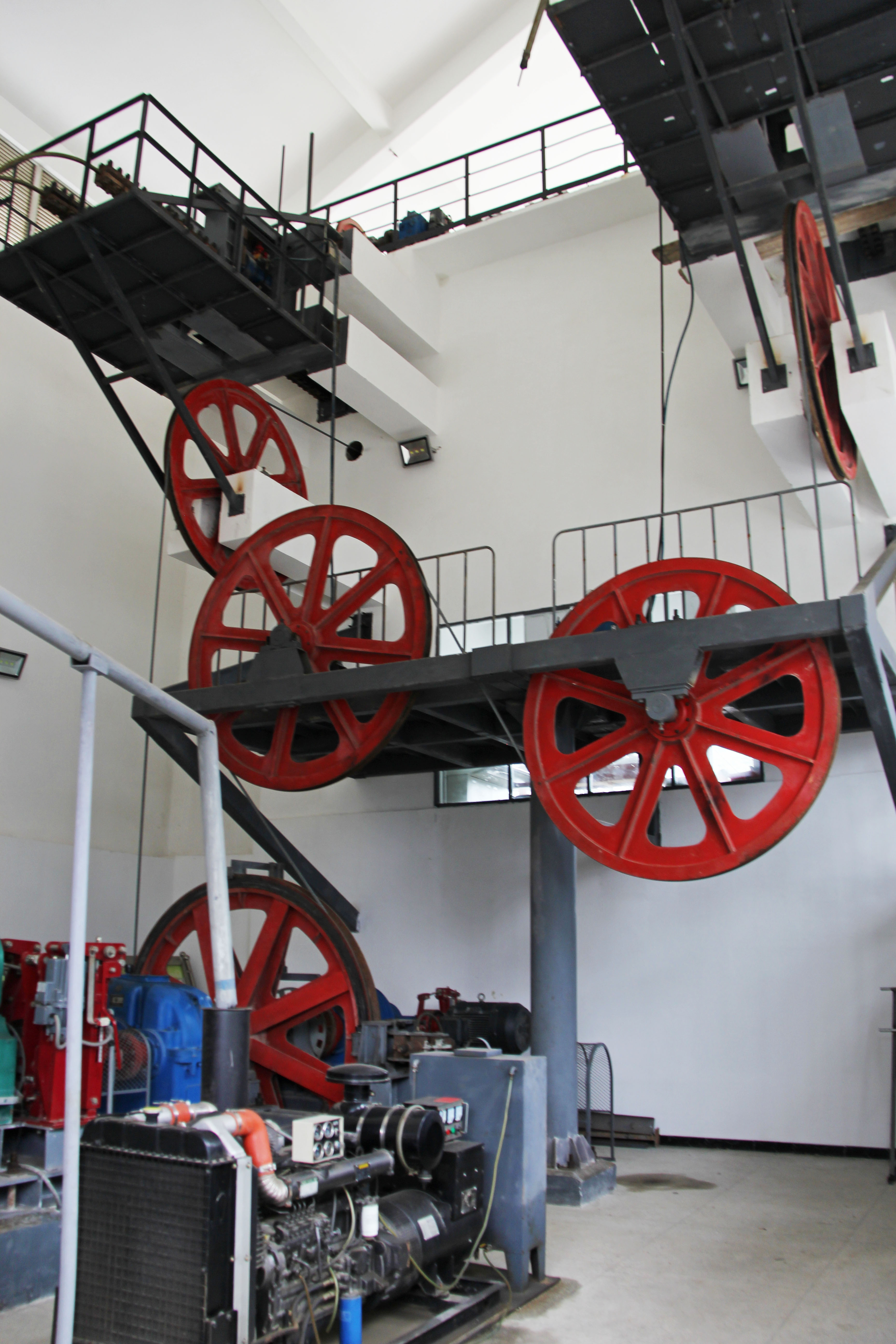
Gulucun Tramway motor room.

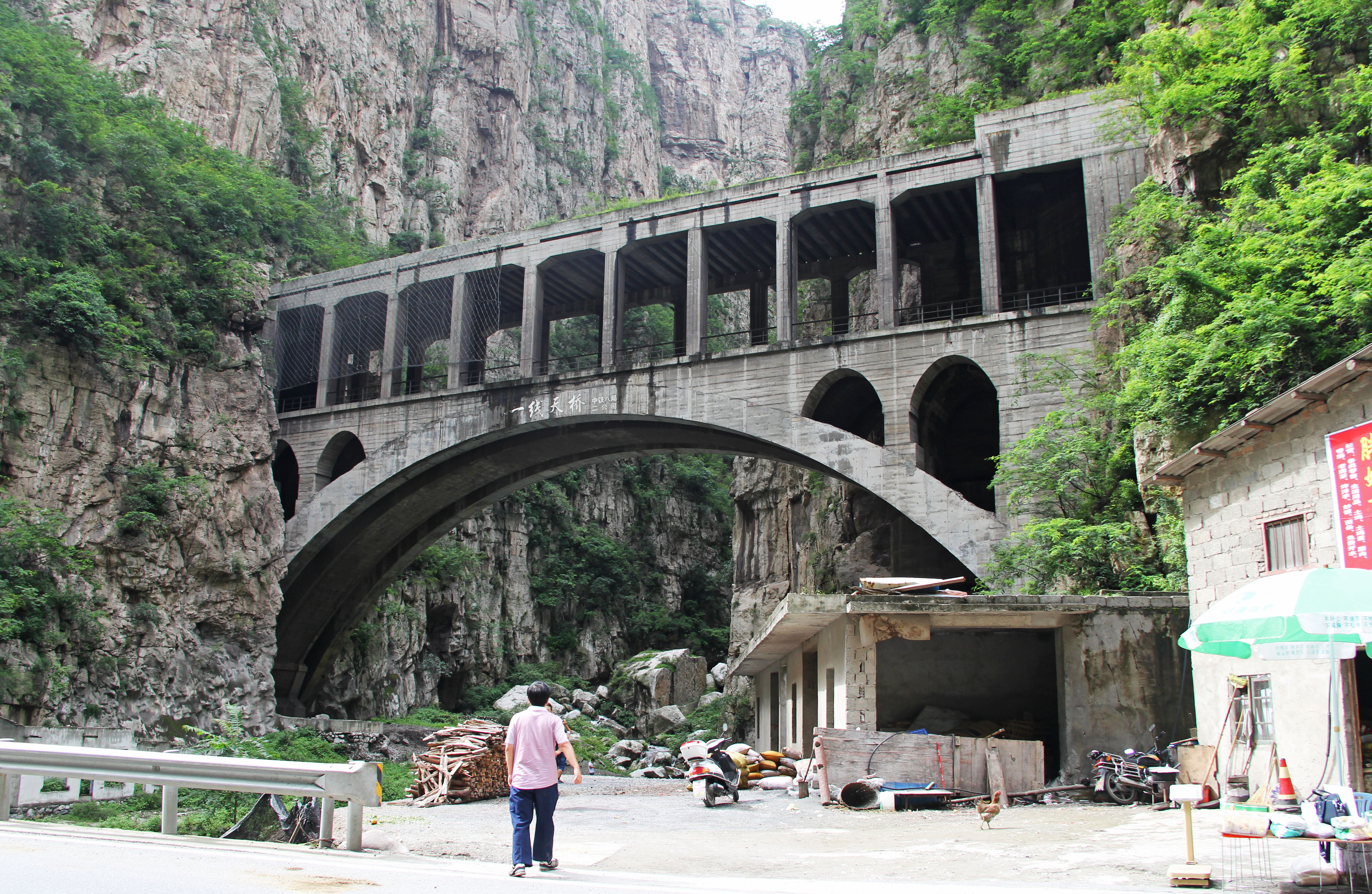
Chengdu–Kunming railway Yixiantain Bridge across the mouth of Laochang Creek.
