= Battle of Tianquan =

1950 battle

- Part of Chinese Civil War
Date	February 14–20, 1950
Location	Tianquan County, Sichuan, China
Result	Communist victory

Belligerents
Republic of China	People's Republic of China

Commanders and leaders
(Taiwan) Cheng Zhiwu (Taiwan) Li Yuanheng	Unknown

Strength
3,000+ including bandits	100

Casualties and losses
300+ killed Over 100 captured	Minor

The Battle of Tianquan was fought between the communists and the nationalists during the Chinese Civil War in the post World War II era and resulted in communist victory. It is also called "The Battle to Defend Tianquan" (Tianquan Baoweizhan, 天全保卫战) by the communists.

Order of Battle

- Nationalists (3,000+)
  - Southwestern (China) Anticommunist National Salvation Army
  - Local bandits
- Communists (100+)
  - A company of the 555th Regiment

On February 14, 1950, Cheng Zhiwu (程志武) the nationalist commander of the Southwestern (China) National Revolutionary Army Region negotiated with local bandits headed by Li Yuanheng (李元亨) to ally with him in an assault on the town of Tianquan County (天全) in Xikang (present-day Sichuan). The Nationalist forces expected an easy victory as the town was guarded by a single communist company of the 555th Regiment. The National Revolutionary Army besieged the town on the same day, severing all communications. The garrison was eventually overwhelmed by the Nationalist forces.

On February 15, 1950, over a hundred National Revolutionary Army successfully penetrated into the town via the Western Pass (Xi Guan, 西关) under cover of heavy fire. The People's Liberation Army managed to outflank and rout the attackers. This demoralized the National Revolutionary Arm] who were forced into a stalemate. However, the situation facing the People's Liberation Army defenders was one of short supply and low morale. The final assault which occurred on the February 20, 1950, with over a hundred National Revolutionary Army soldiers successfully taking over a bunker in the Tianquan. The defending company of the 555th Regiment then counterattacked and besieged the bunker. The successful dynamiting of the bunker by the People's Liberation Army resulted in a military rout for the National Revolutionary Army. The Cheng Zhiwu was unable to stop his fleeing troops, forcing a complete withdraw. Given the opportunity, the People's Liberation Army counterattacked, inflicting further casualties on the[National Revolutionary Arm] and taking over a hundred prisoners.

The[National Revolutionary Army's failure was due to the reliance on poorly trained bandits. The bandits themselves were poorly organised and unwilling to fight. The few dedicated anticommunists under Cheng Zhiwu were not able to change the tide of the battle.

== See also ==
- Outline of the Chinese Civil War
- Outline of the military history of the People's Republic of China
- National Revolutionary Army
- History of the People's Liberation Army
