= Yucheng, Ya'an =

Yucheng 雨城区
- District
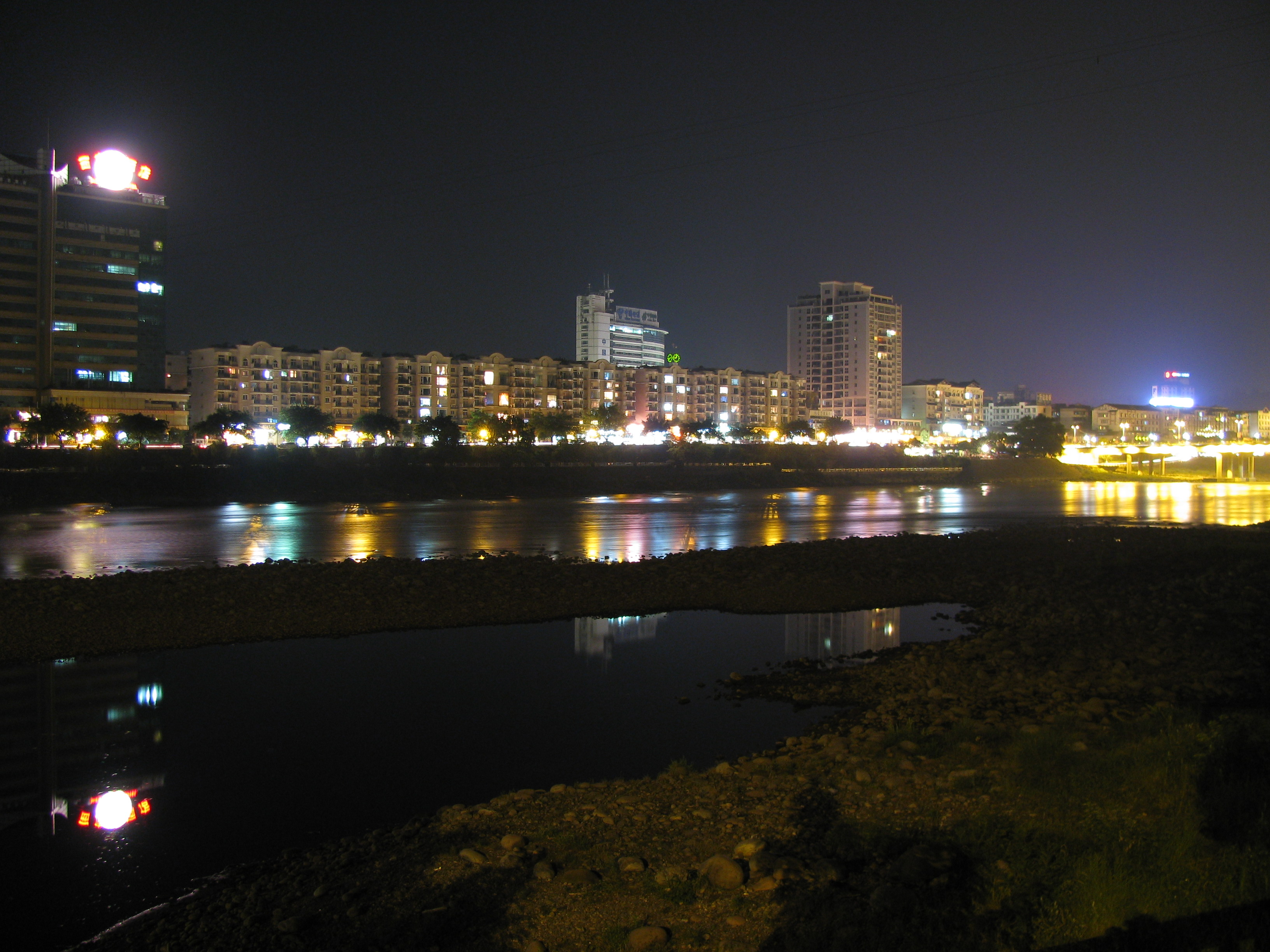
- City centre at night

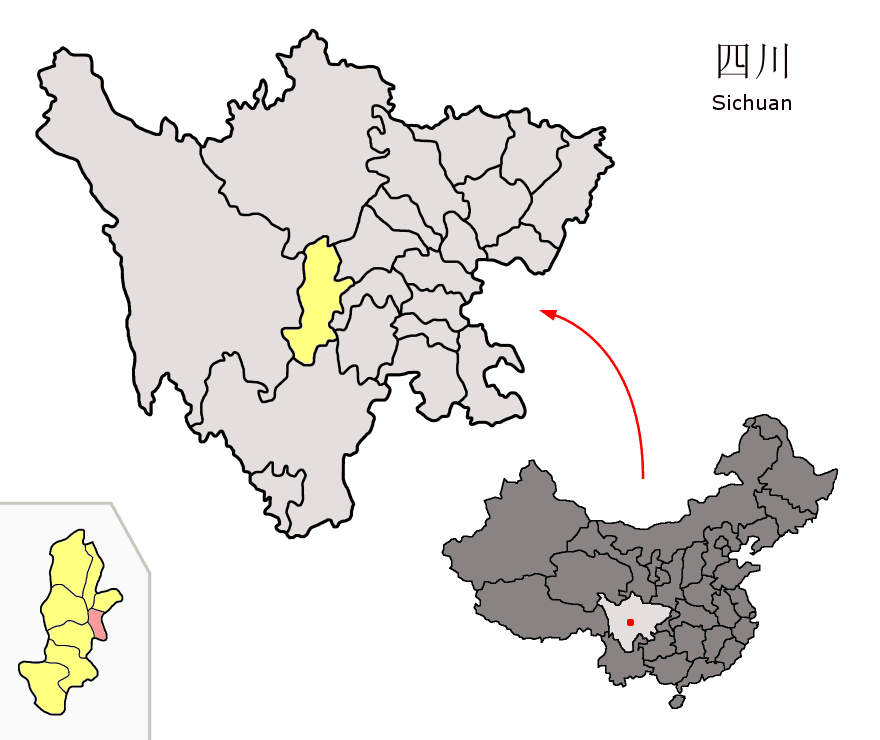
- Location of Yucheng District (red) in Ya'an City (yellow) and Sichuan province

- Location in Sichuan
- Coordinates: 30°00′22″N 103°01′57″E
- Country: China
- Province: Sichuan
- Prefecture-level city: Ya'an
- District seat: Qingjiang Subdistrict

Area
  - Total: 1,060 km^{2} (410 sq mi)

Population (2020 census)
  - Total: 368,909
  - Density: 348/km^{2} (901/sq mi)
- Time zone: UTC+8 (China Standard)
- Website: www.yayc.gov.cn

Yucheng (Chinese: 雨城; pinyin: Yǔchéng) is a county-level district of Ya'an, a prefecture-level city in Sichuan Province, China. The district contains the city centre of Ya'an as well as the surrounding countryside.

== Administrative divisions ==
Yucheng is divided in 5 subdistricts and 8 towns.

Subdistricts

- Dongcheng (东城街道)
- Xicheng (西城街道)
- Hebei (河北街道)
- Qingjiang (青江街道)
- Daxing (大兴街道)

Towns

- Caoba (草坝镇)
- Shangli (上里镇)
- Yanchang (晏场镇)
- Duoying (多营镇)
- Bifengxia (碧峰峡镇)
- Zhougongshan (周公山镇)
- Babu (八步镇)
