= Shangli Town =

Shangli 上里
- Town
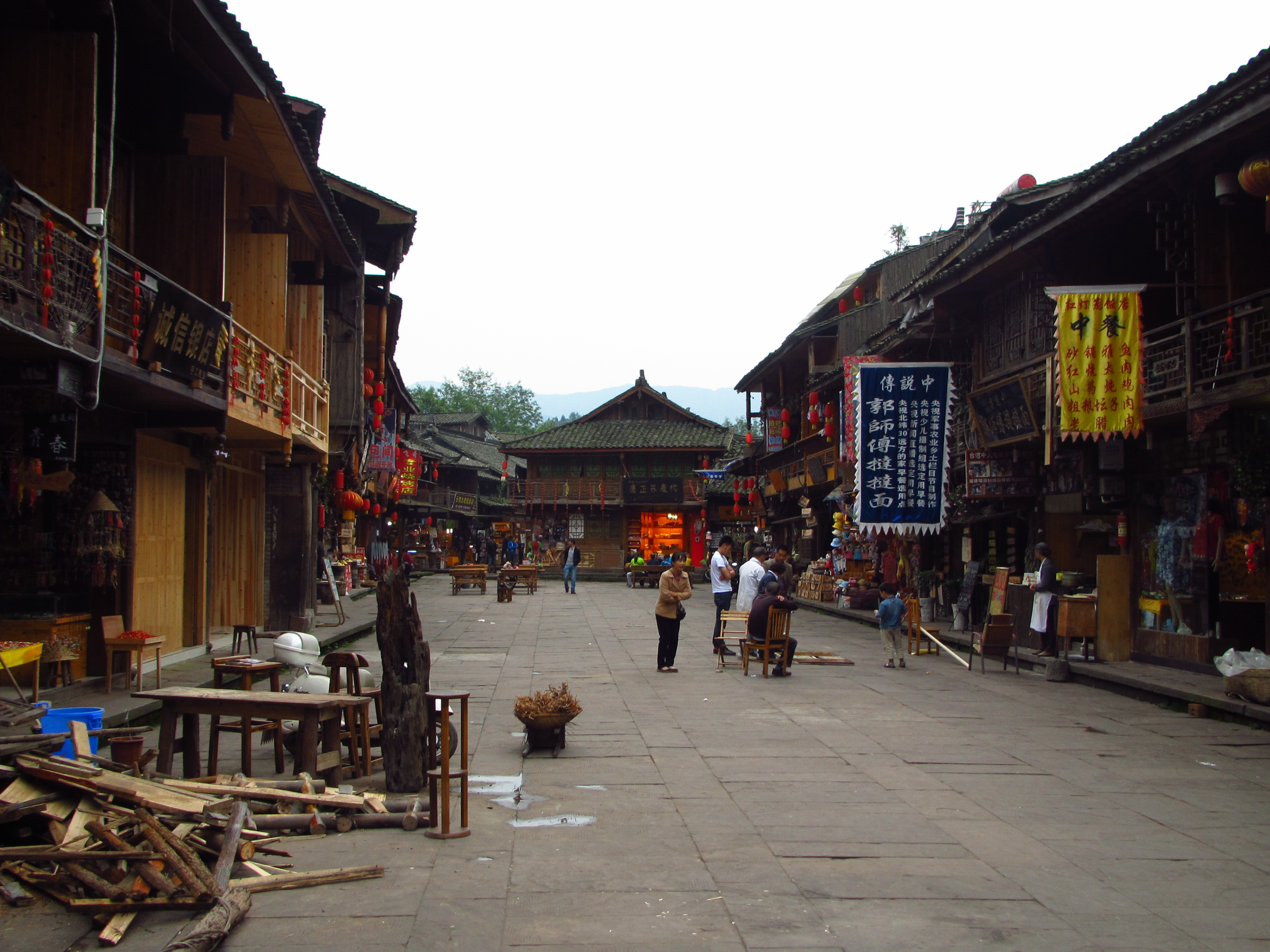
- Shangli Ancient Town

- Location in China Shangli (Sichuan)
- Coordinates: 30°10′58″N 103°04′33″E
- Country: China
- Province: Sichuan
- Prefecture: Ya'an
- County: Yucheng District

Shangli Town (Chinese: 上里镇; pinyin: Shànglǐ Zhèn) is a town in Yucheng District, Ya'an, Sichuan, China. The town contains Shangli Ancient Town, a historic town that now acts as a tourist attraction.
