= Tianquan County =

Coordinates: 30°04′01″N 102°45′31″E

Tianquan County 天全县
- County
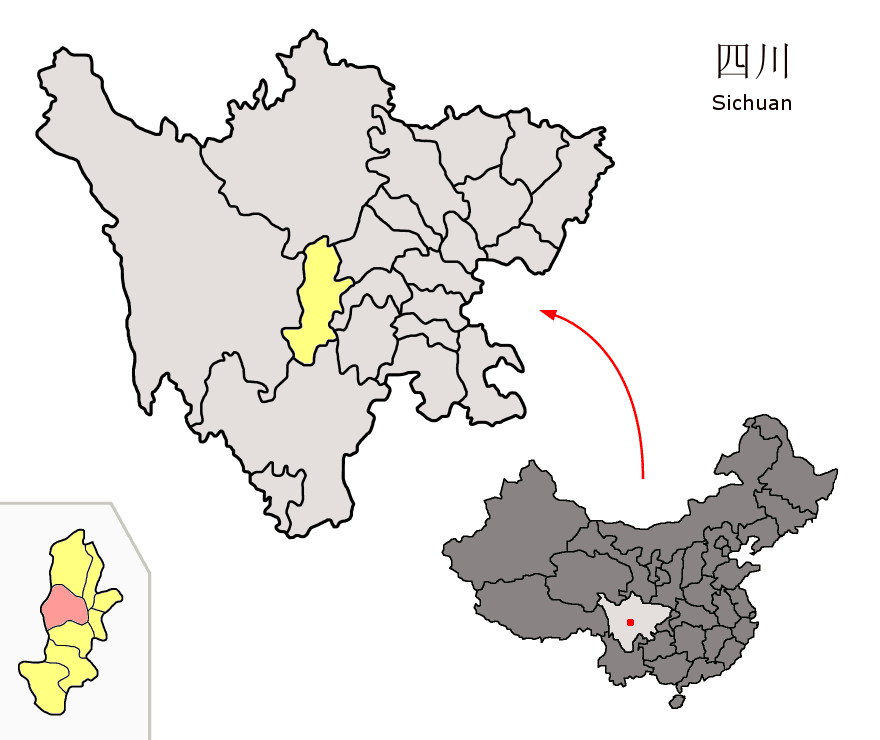
- Location of Tianquan County (red) within Ya'an City (yellow) and Sichuan
- Country: China
- Province: Sichuan
- Prefecture-level city: Ya'an
- County seat: Chengxiang

Area
  - Total: 2,394 km^{2} (924 sq mi)

Population (2020 census)
  - Total: 132,033
  - Density: 55.15/km^{2} (142.8/sq mi)
- Time zone: UTC+8 (China Standard)

Tianquan County (Chinese: 天全县; pinyin: Tiānquán Xiàn) is a county of Sichuan Province, China. It is under the administration of Ya'an City. In 1950, the county bore witness to the Battle of Tianquan, which resulted in the communists defeating the nationalists.

== Administrative divisions ==
Tianquan County comprises 7 towns and 3 townships:

towns

- Chengxiang Town (城厢镇)
- Shiyang Town (始阳镇)
- Sijing Town (思经镇)
- Labahe Town (喇叭河镇)
- Xiaohe Town (小河镇)
- Renyi Town (仁义镇)
- Xinchang Town (新场镇)

townships

- Leying Township (乐英乡)
- Xinhua Township (新华乡)
- Xingye Township (兴业乡)

== Climate ==
Climate data for Tianquan, elevation 819 m (2,687 ft), (1991–2020 normals, extremes 1981–present)
Month	Jan	Feb	Mar	Apr	May	Jun	Jul	Aug	Sep	Oct	Nov	Dec	Year
Record high °C (°F)	19.0 (66.2)	21.8 (71.2)	30.4 (86.7)	31.2 (88.2)	33.5 (92.3)	33.9 (93.0)	36.0 (96.8)	37.0 (98.6)	34.6 (94.3)	28.6 (83.5)	23.6 (74.5)	17.9 (64.2)	37.0 (98.6)
Mean daily maximum °C (°F)	8.7 (47.7)	11.3 (52.3)	15.9 (60.6)	21.6 (70.9)	25.1 (77.2)	27.3 (81.1)	29.3 (84.7)	29.2 (84.6)	24.8 (76.6)	19.9 (67.8)	15.3 (59.5)	10.1 (50.2)	19.9 (67.8)
Daily mean °C (°F)	5.3 (41.5)	7.4 (45.3)	11.2 (52.2)	16.1 (61.0)	19.6 (67.3)	22.3 (72.1)	24.2 (75.6)	23.9 (75.0)	20.5 (68.9)	16.2 (61.2)	11.9 (53.4)	6.8 (44.2)	15.5 (59.8)
Mean daily minimum °C (°F)	3.1 (37.6)	4.8 (40.6)	8.0 (46.4)	12.3 (54.1)	15.9 (60.6)	18.8 (65.8)	20.7 (69.3)	20.6 (69.1)	17.9 (64.2)	14.1 (57.4)	9.7 (49.5)	4.7 (40.5)	12.5 (54.6)
Record low °C (°F)	−4.0 (24.8)	−2.1 (28.2)	−1.6 (29.1)	3.5 (38.3)	6.6 (43.9)	12.5 (54.5)	14.5 (58.1)	14.6 (58.3)	11.5 (52.7)	4.6 (40.3)	−0.2 (31.6)	−6.7 (19.9)	−6.7 (19.9)
Average precipitation mm (inches)	26.8 (1.06)	37.5 (1.48)	71.2 (2.80)	106.6 (4.20)	148.9 (5.86)	185.0 (7.28)	298.2 (11.74)	334.7 (13.18)	184.8 (7.28)	102.1 (4.02)	51.2 (2.02)	27.9 (1.10)	1,574.9 (62.02)
Average precipitation days (≥ 0.1 mm)	15.4	15.7	19.2	18.5	19.4	21.4	20.8	19.8	22.1	22.6	17.2	14.7	226.8
Average snowy days	2.8	1.2	0.1	0	0	0	0	0	0	0	0.1	0.7	4.9
Average relative humidity (%)	85	84	82	80	78	81	83	83	86	87	86	86	83
Mean monthly sunshine hours	44.2	46.1	72.3	100.7	100.9	93.8	119.2	127.1	62.0	47.3	51.4	48.9	913.9
Percentage possible sunshine	14	15	19	26	24	22	28	31	17	14	16	16	20
Source: China Meteorological Administration all-time extreme temperature all-time January high
