= Ya'an =

Ya'an 雅安市
- Prefecture-level city
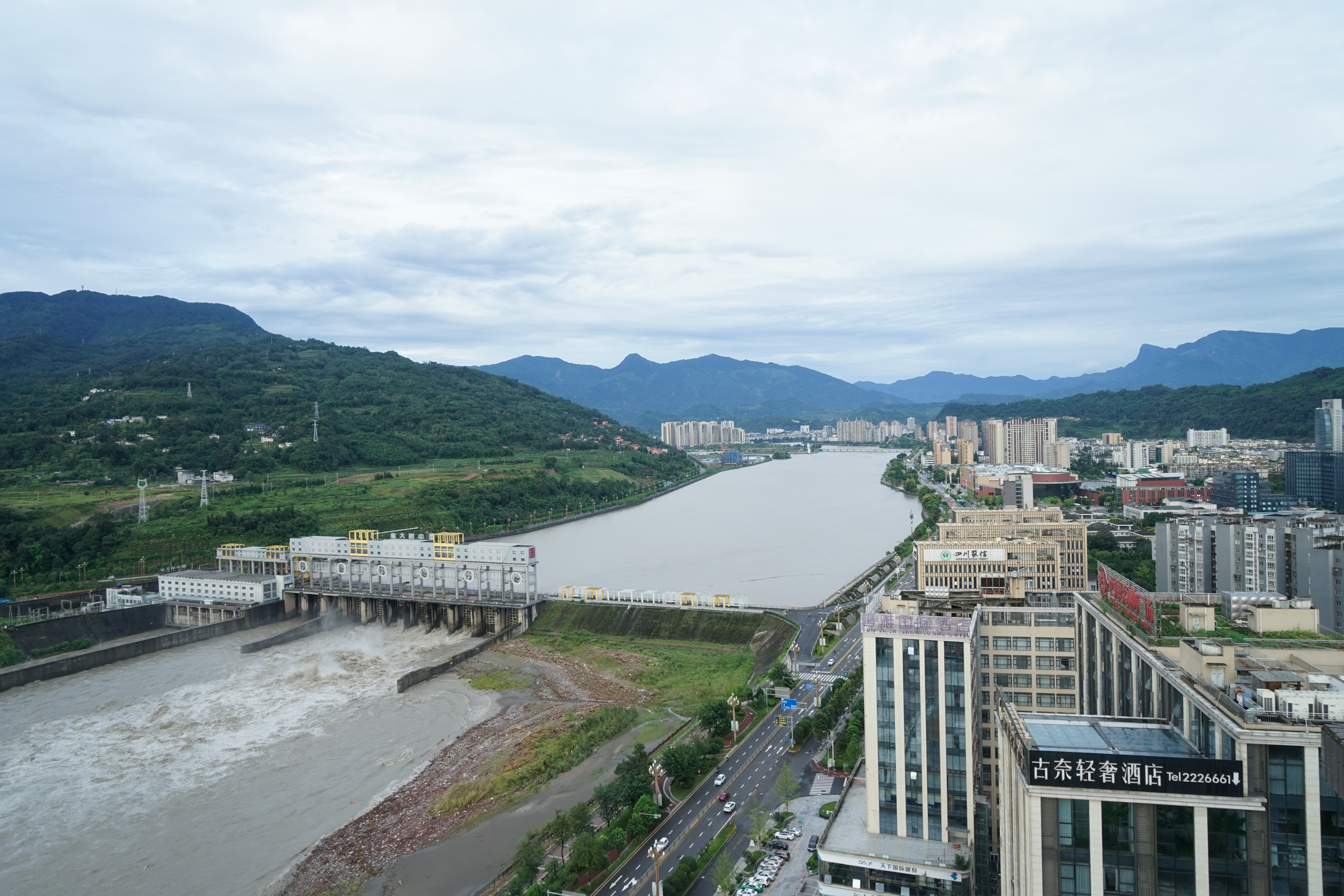
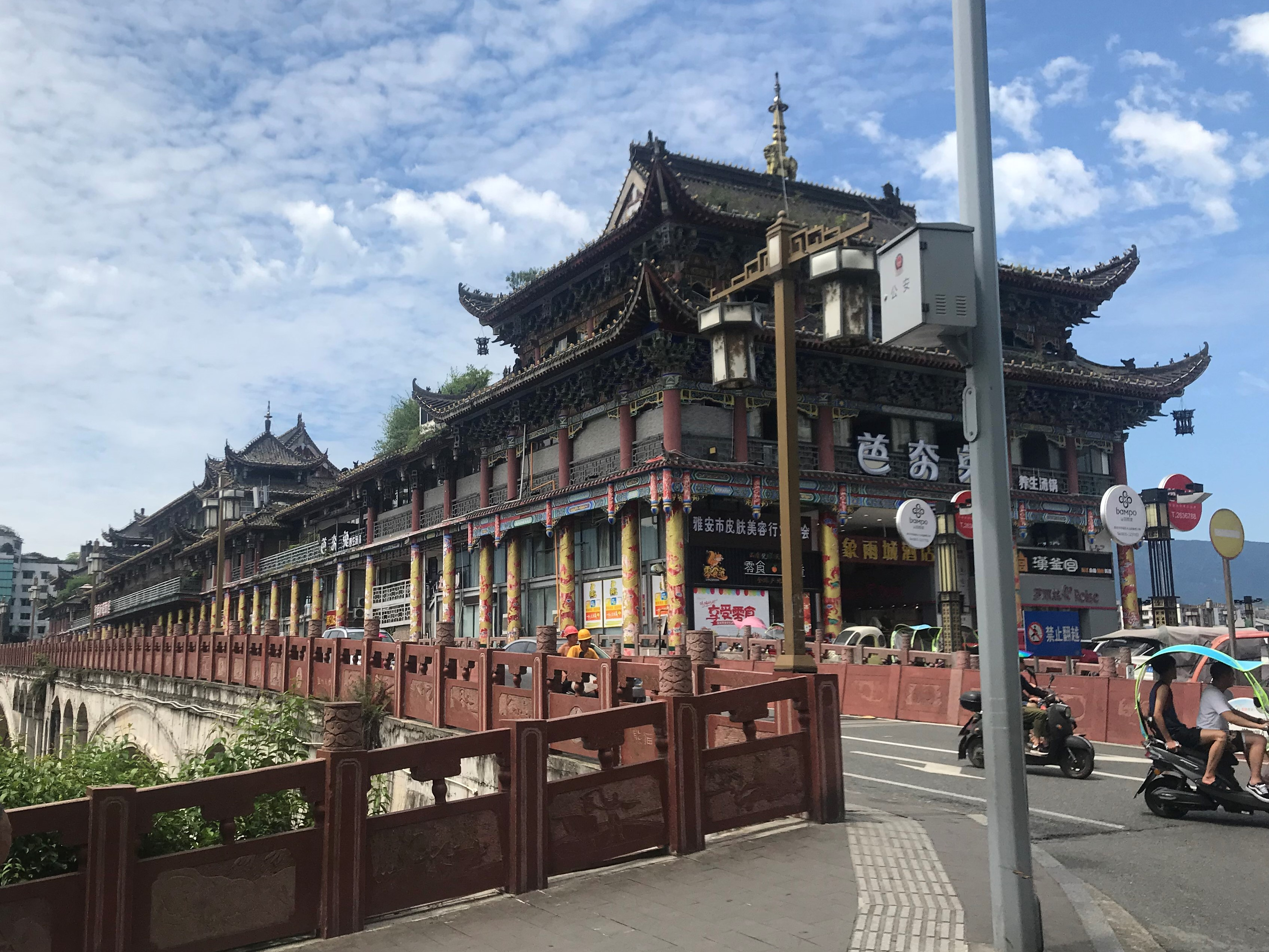
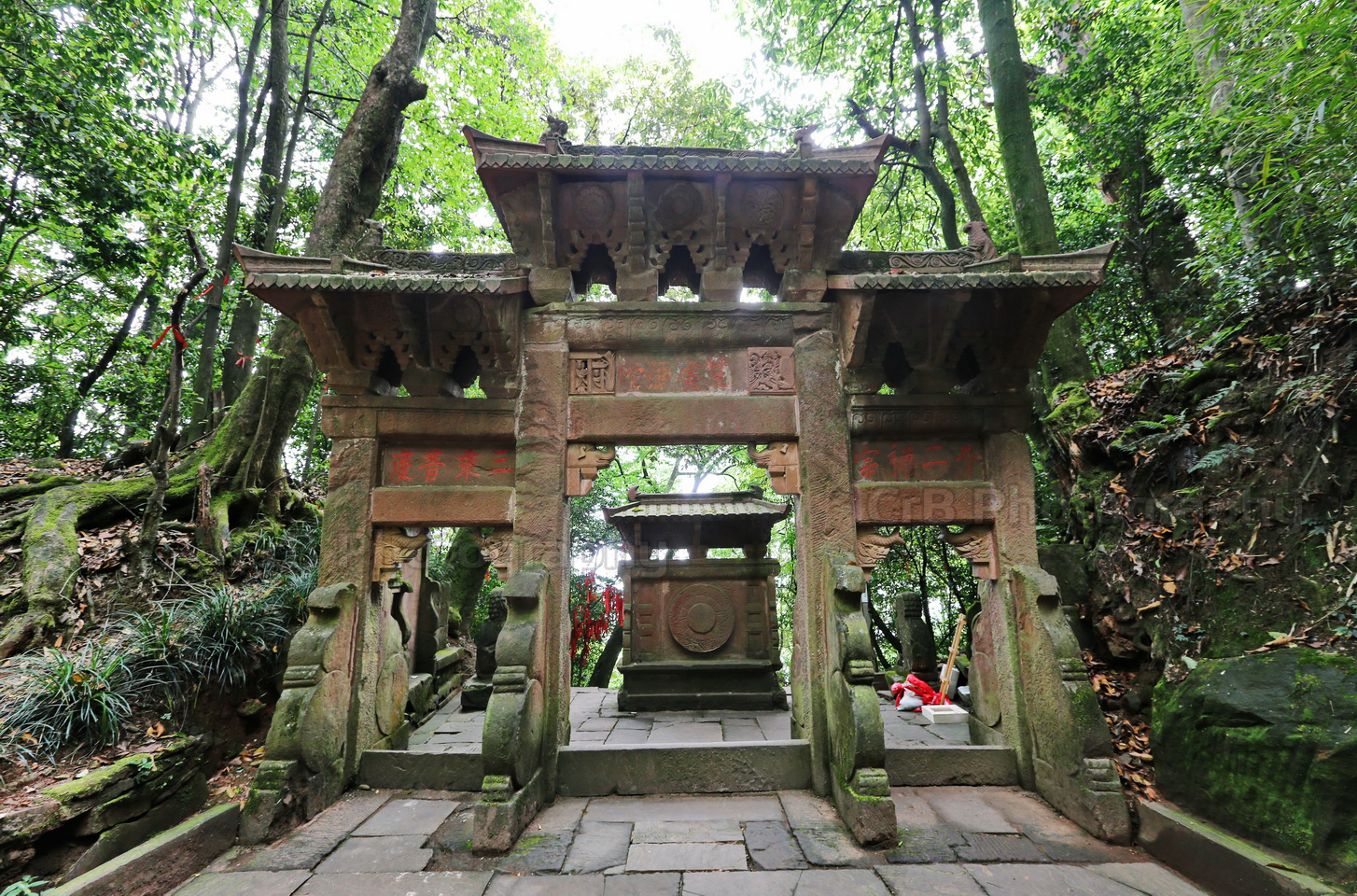
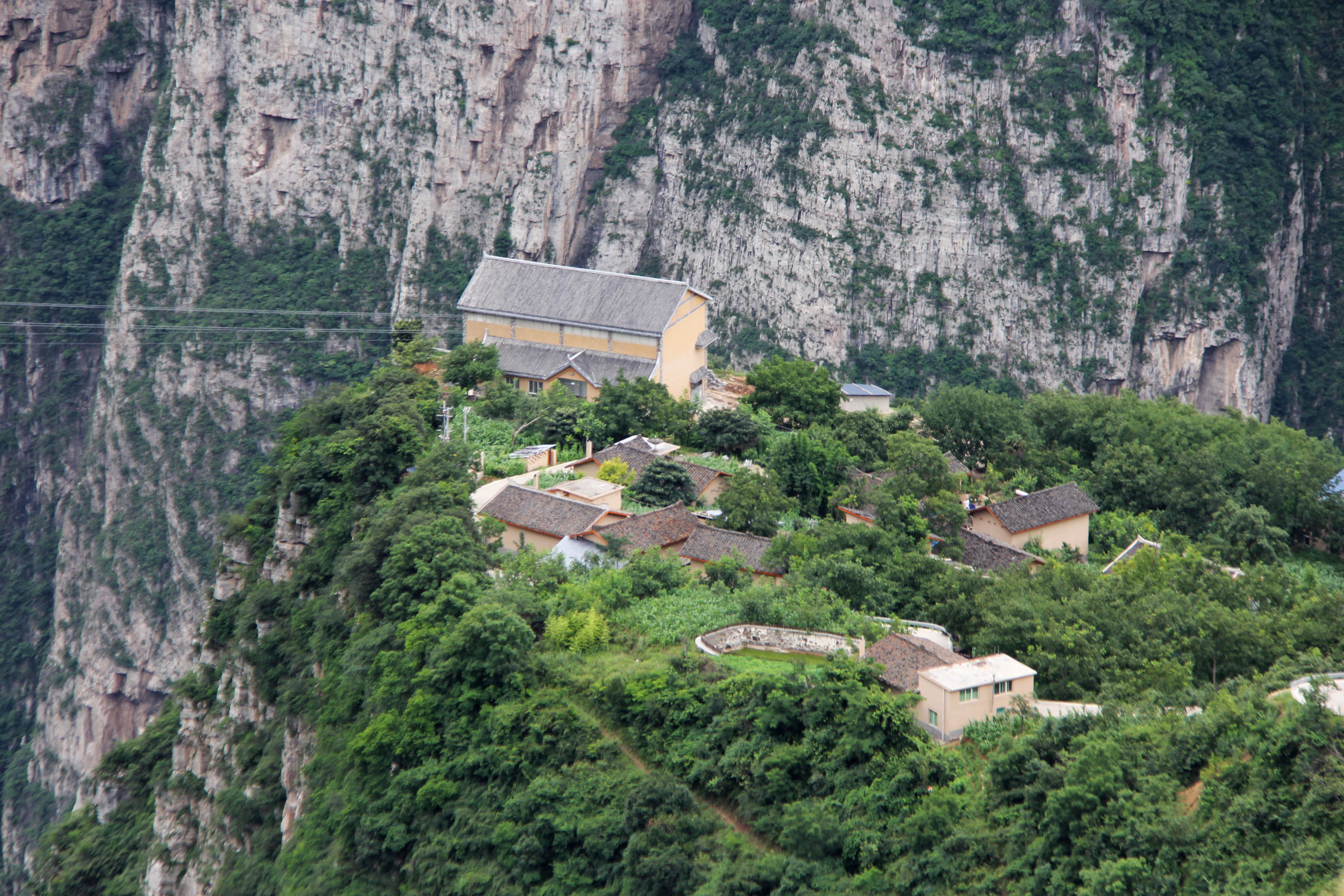
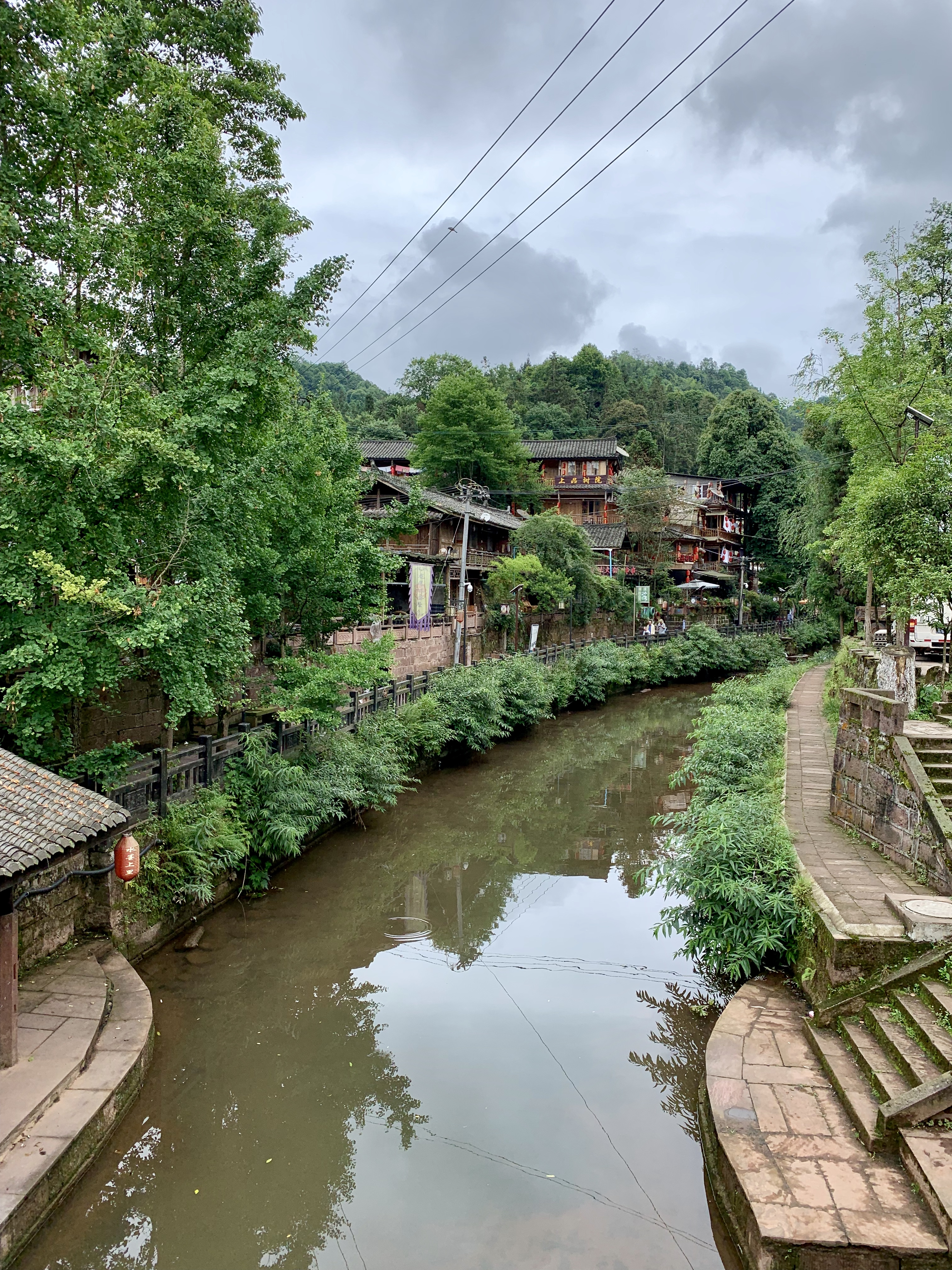
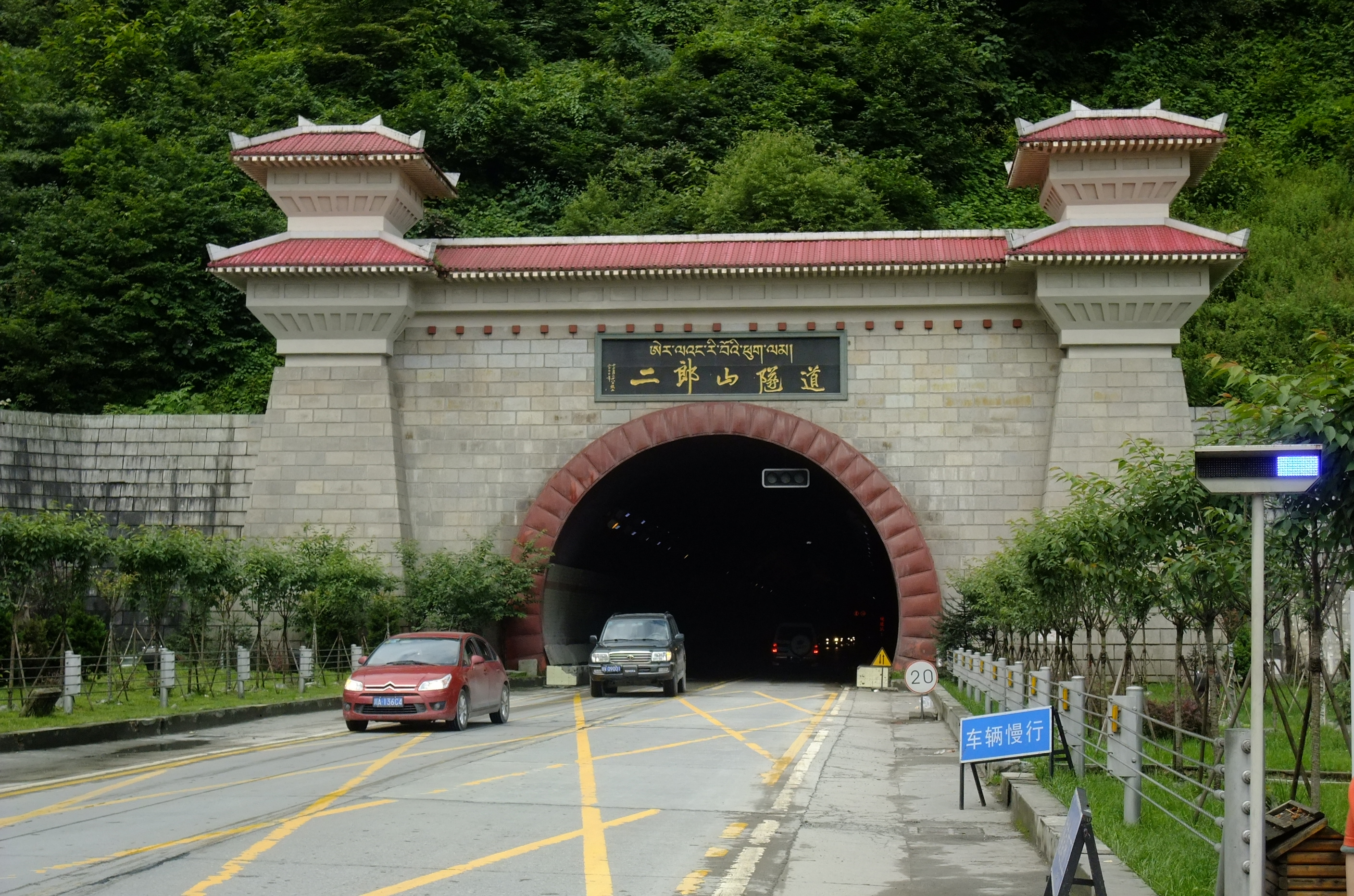
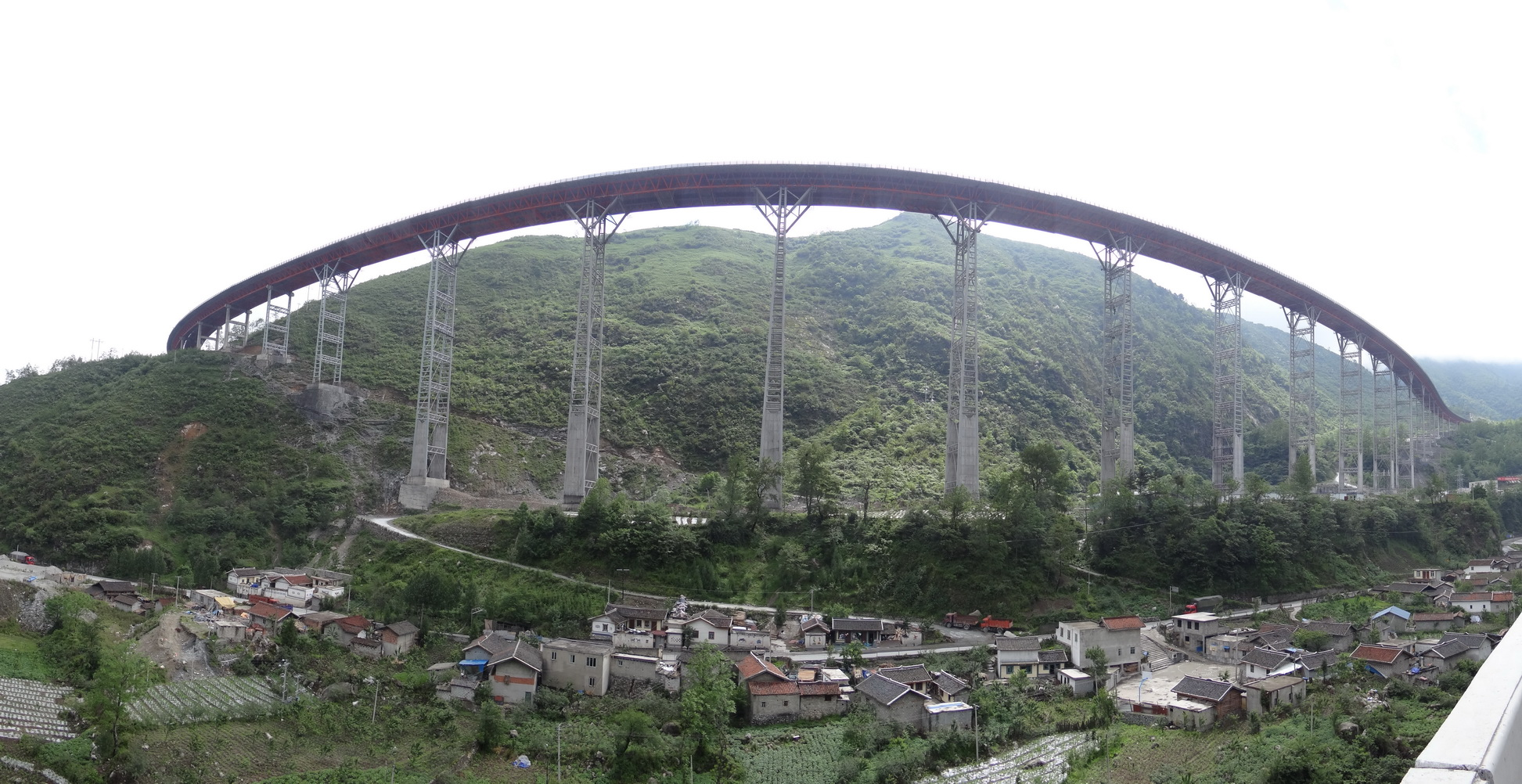
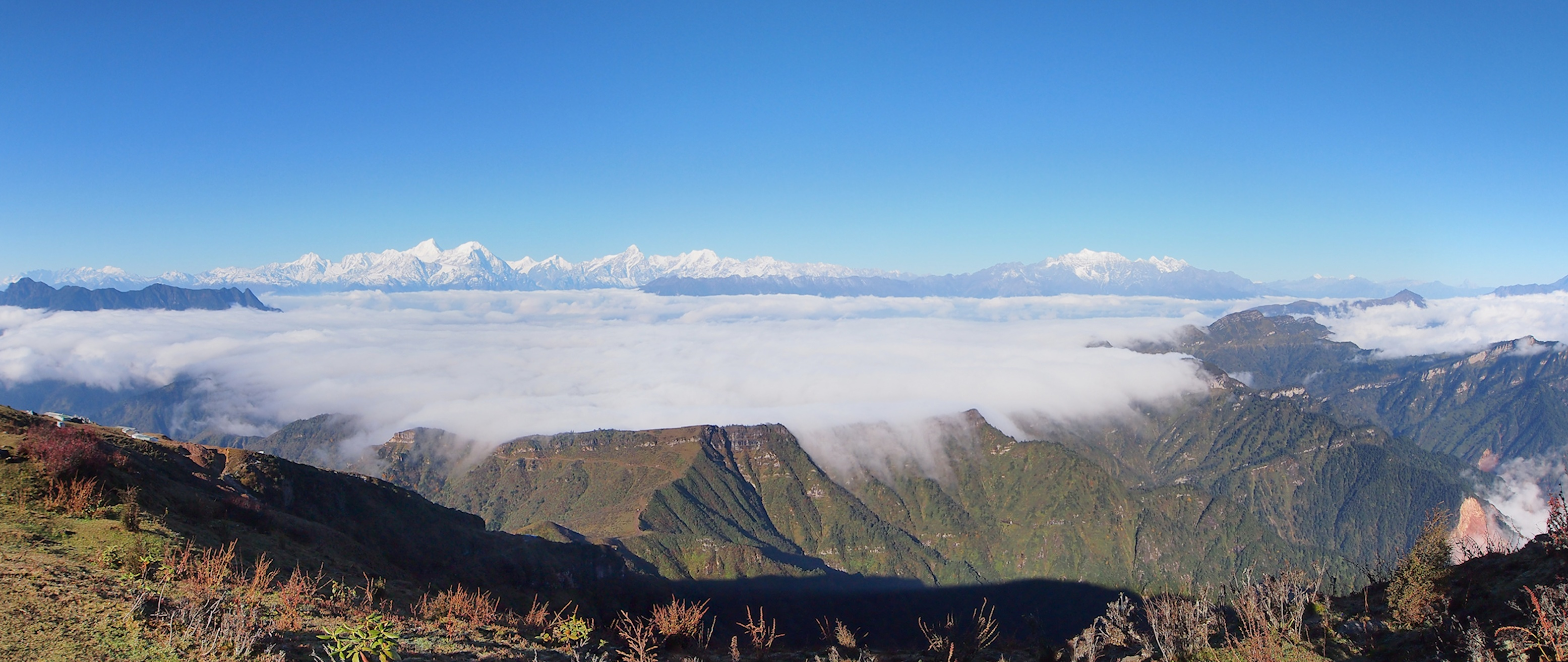
- Qingyi River in Yucheng District Yazhou Covered Bridge Stone Archway of Ganlu Lingquan Temple Gulu Village in Hanyuan County Shangli Ancient Town Mount Erlang Tunnel of China National Highway 318 Ganhaizi Bridge of G5 Expressway in Shimian County Minya Konka from Niubei Mountains

- Location of Ya'an City jurisdiction in Sichuan
- Coordinates (Ya'an Bureau of Civil Affairs (雅安市民政局)): 29°58′44″N 103°01′01″E
- Country: People's Republic of China
- Province: Sichuan
- Municipal seat: Yucheng District

Area
  - Total: 15,213.28 km^{2} (5,873.88 sq mi)
- Elevation: 580 m (1,900 ft)

Population (2020)
  - Total: 1,434,603
  - Density: 94.29939/km^{2} (244.2343/sq mi)

GDP
  - Total: CN¥ 50.3 billion US$ 8.1 billion
  - Per capita: CN¥ 32,524; US$ 5,222
- Time zone: UTC+8 (China Standard)
- Postal code: 625000
- Area code: 0835
- ISO 3166 code: CN-SC-18
- Licence plate prefixes: 川T
- Website: www.yaan.gov.cn/htm/index.htm

Ya'an (Chinese: 雅安; pinyin: Yǎ'ān; Wade–Giles: Ya-an) is a prefecture-level city in the western part of Sichuan province, China, located just below the Tibetan Plateau. The city is home to Sichuan Agricultural University, the only 211 Project university and the largest regional comprehensive university in Ya'an. As of the 2020 Chinese census, Ya'an has a population of 1,434,603.

== History ==
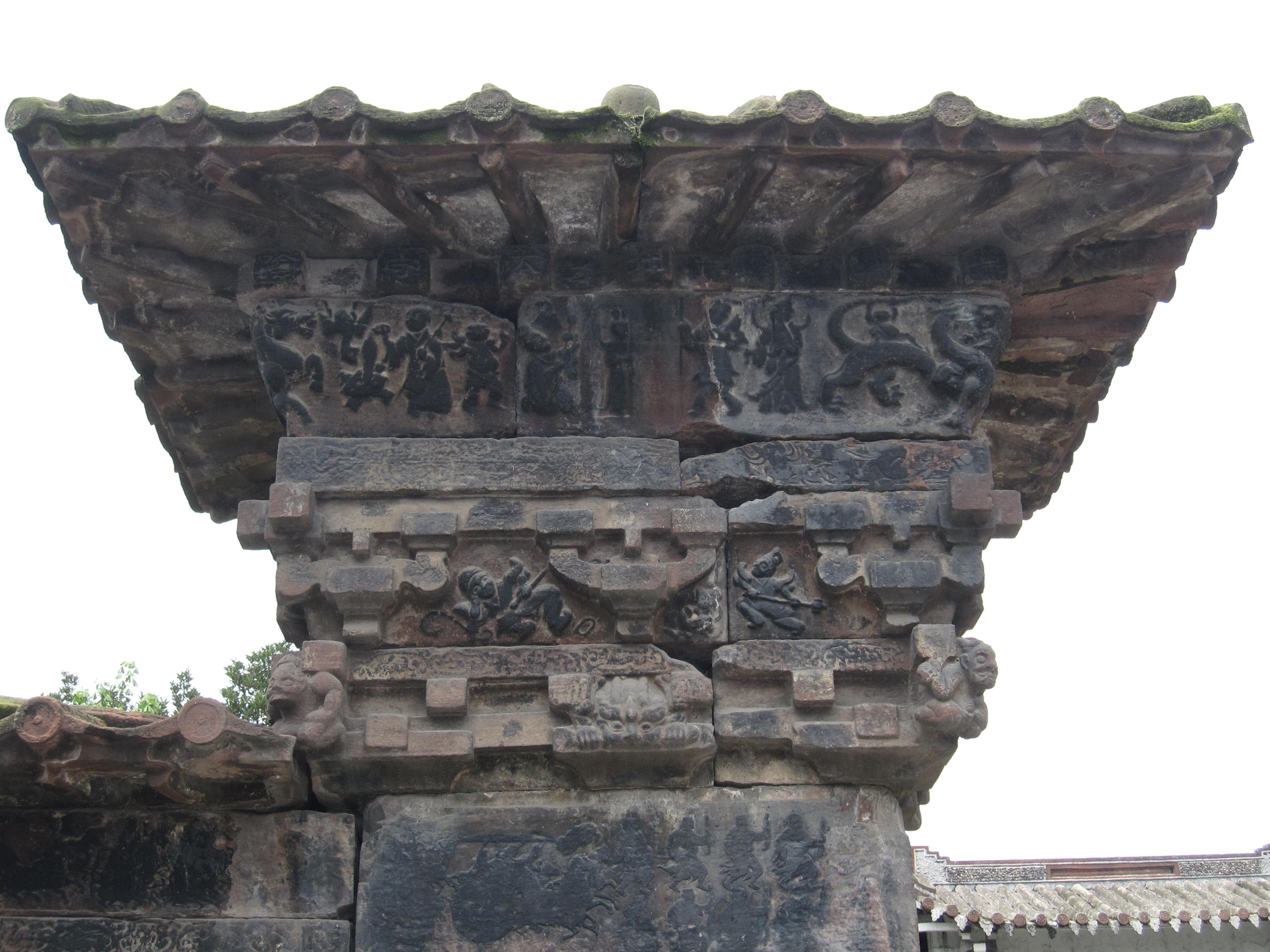
A surviving element of the que (tower) (gate tower) at the Tomb of Gao Yi, ca. 209 CE

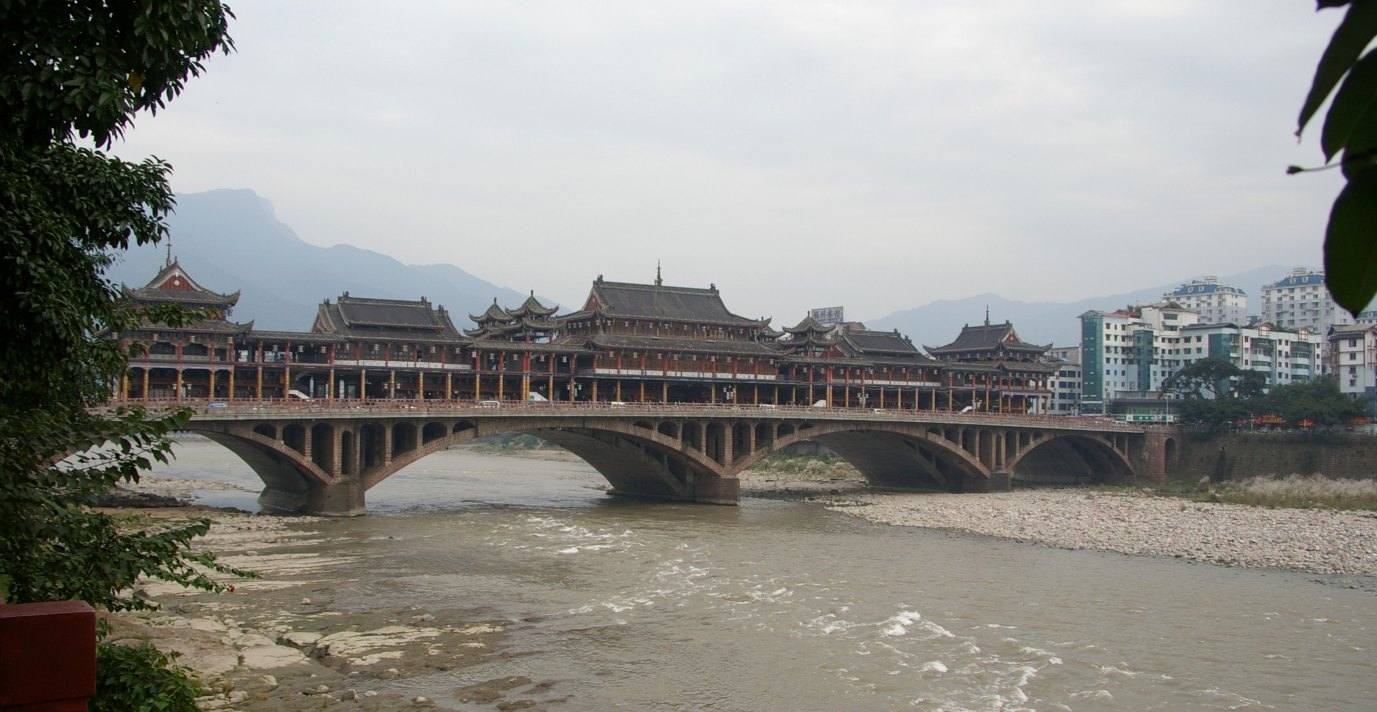
A bridge with ancient Chinese architectural features, across Qingyi River, at town centre of Ya'an

Previously known as Yazhou-fu, the city is first mentioned during the Zhou dynasty (1122–255 BCE). It served as a county seat during the Qin and Han dynasties, but was subsequently taken by nomadic tribes. After being reintegrated into the Chinese Empire in the late 5th century, it was made the seat of the Ya Prefecture in 604. The modern Ya'an county was established in 1912. It became the provincial capital of Xikang province in 1951, but has been a municipality under the administration of Sichuan province since 1955, when Xikang province was merged and became a part of Sichuan province.

The first giant panda was found in Baoxing County of Ya'an; Ya'an is also the origin of artificial planting tea of the world; Mengding Mountain in Mingshan County, has been keeping seven tea trees, which are believed to be the origins of tea, for more than 1,000 years.

"The busy little town [of Yaan] was full of life, for its market is the only trading centre for the Chinese and Tibetans from Kangting. Accompanied by two coolies, I crossed the long suspension bridge which oscillates alarmingly over the Ya Ho. I got separated from my coolies in the dense crowd which swarmed along the main street, but in the end found them, and my luggage, at the Catholic mission, where two venerable fathers welcomed me with the flowery courtesy of mandarins...

Yaan is the main market for a special kind of tea which is grown in this part of the country and exported in very large quantities to Tibet via Kangting and over the caravan routes through Batang (Paan) and Teko. Although the Chinese regard it as an inferior product, it is greatly esteemed by the Tibetans for its powerful flavor, which harmonizes particularly well with that of yak butter and salt which Tibetans often mix with their tea. Brick tea comprises not only what we call tea leaves, but also the coarser leaves and some of the twigs of the shrub, as well as the leaves and fruit of other plants and trees (the alder, for instance). This amalgam is steamed, weighed, and compressed into hard bricks, which are packed up in coarse matting in subunits of four. These rectangular parcels weigh between twenty-two and twenty-six pounds—the quality of the tea makes a slight difference to the weight—and are carried to Kangting by coolies. A long string of them, moving slowly under their monstrous burdens of tea, was a familiar sight along the road I followed."

— André Migot, Tibetan Marches (1955). Translated by Peter Fleming

Panda tea is also a local speciality.

On April 20, 2013, the city was hit by a major earthquake, causing numerous casualties and heavy damage to housing and infrastructure.

== Geography ==
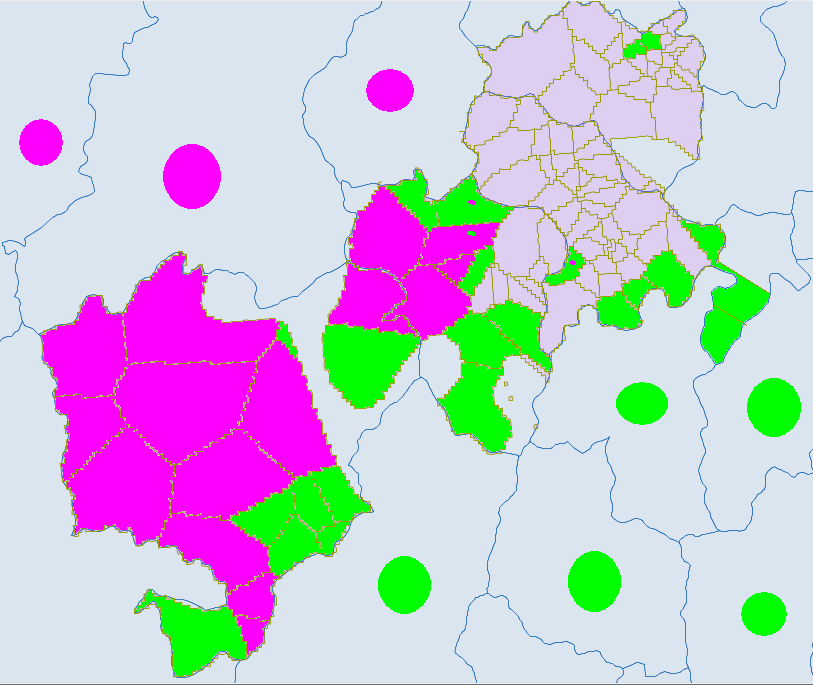
Light green -Yi. Pink -Tibetan.

Ya'an is located at the western edge of the Sichuan Basin and on the upper reaches of the Yangtze, covering the transition between the Chengdu Plain and the Tibetan Plateau. Its latitude ranges from 28° 51′ 10″ — 30° 56′ 40″ N and its longitude from 101° 56′ 26″—103° 23′ 28″ E. Neighbouring prefectures are, starting from the northeast and moving counter-clockwise, Chengdu (NE), Meishan (E), Leshan (SE), Liangshan Yi Autonomous Prefecture (S), Garzê Tibetan Autonomous Prefecture (W), and Ngawa Tibetan and Qiang Autonomous Prefecture (N). With an area of 15,300 square kilometres (5,910 sq mi) and a population of 1,530,000, The city is encircled by mountains, and four rivers flow through it.

Its distance to Chengdu is 140 kilometres (87 mi).

== Climate ==
Ya'an has a monsoon-influenced humid subtropical climate (Köppen Cwa) and is largely mild and humid. The presence of the mountains to the northwest greatly affects the city's climate. In the short winters, they help shield the city from cold Siberian winds. January averages 6.3 °C (43.3 °F), and while frost may occur, snow is rare. Summers are hot and humid, with highs often reaching 30 °C (86 °F), yet extended heat waves are rare; the daily average in July and August is around 25 °C (77 °F). Rainfall is common year-round, though in winter it tends to be light, and is particularly heavy in summer, when warm, humid southerly or southeasterly winds blow against the mountains, causing orographic lift to occur, enhancing rainfall. With nearly 1,700 millimetres (67 in) of rainfall occurring on 213 days per year, Ya'an is also known as the "Rain City". In addition, rain often falls at night, so fog is not a common occurrence.

Climate data for Ya'an, elevation 628 m (2,060 ft), (1991–2020 normals, extremes 1971–present)
Month	Jan	Feb	Mar	Apr	May	Jun	Jul	Aug	Sep	Oct	Nov	Dec	Year
Record high °C (°F)	20.4 (68.7)	23.9 (75.0)	31.8 (89.2)	34.6 (94.3)	35.7 (96.3)	36.5 (97.7)	38.6 (101.5)	37.9 (100.2)	34.9 (94.8)	31.2 (88.2)	24.9 (76.8)	19.8 (67.6)	38.6 (101.5)
Mean daily maximum °C (°F)	9.6 (49.3)	12.3 (54.1)	17.1 (62.8)	22.8 (73.0)	26.2 (79.2)	28.5 (83.3)	30.4 (86.7)	30.1 (86.2)	25.4 (77.7)	20.5 (68.9)	16.0 (60.8)	10.9 (51.6)	20.8 (69.5)
Daily mean °C (°F)	6.4 (43.5)	8.6 (47.5)	12.6 (54.7)	17.6 (63.7)	21.1 (70.0)	23.7 (74.7)	25.5 (77.9)	25.2 (77.4)	21.5 (70.7)	17.0 (62.6)	12.8 (55.0)	7.9 (46.2)	16.7 (62.0)
Mean daily minimum °C (°F)	4.4 (39.9)	6.2 (43.2)	9.6 (49.3)	14.1 (57.4)	17.7 (63.9)	20.5 (68.9)	22.4 (72.3)	22.2 (72.0)	19.1 (66.4)	14.9 (58.8)	10.7 (51.3)	5.9 (42.6)	14.0 (57.2)
Record low °C (°F)	−2.8 (27.0)	−1.6 (29.1)	−0.7 (30.7)	3.2 (37.8)	10.0 (50.0)	14.3 (57.7)	17.1 (62.8)	16.6 (61.9)	12.9 (55.2)	4.8 (40.6)	1.2 (34.2)	−3.9 (25.0)	−3.9 (25.0)
Average precipitation mm (inches)	19.9 (0.78)	30.3 (1.19)	53.0 (2.09)	94.6 (3.72)	137.6 (5.42)	177.2 (6.98)	348.5 (13.72)	442.9 (17.44)	176.7 (6.96)	98.4 (3.87)	47.7 (1.88)	22.4 (0.88)	1,649.2 (64.93)
Average precipitation days (≥ 0.1 mm)	13.9	14.2	17.3	17.2	17.7	18.9	19.0	18.6	20.2	21.1	15.6	13.7	207.4
Average snowy days	2.1	0.7	0	0	0.2	0.2	0.4	0.5	0.3	0.4	0.2	0.5	5.5
Average relative humidity (%)	79	78	75	73	72	75	78	79	82	84	82	81	78
Mean monthly sunshine hours	42.9	46.9	76.2	101.9	102.2	93.4	118.1	125.6	58.3	42.2	47.4	46.2	901.3
Percentage possible sunshine	13	15	20	26	24	22	28	31	16	12	15	15	20
Source 1: China Meteorological Administration all-time January high
Source 2: Weather China

== Administrative subdivisions ==
Map
Name	Hanzi	Hanyu Pinyin	Population (2020)	Area (km^{2})	Density (/km^{2})
Yucheng District	雨城区	Yǔchéng Qū	368,909	1,060	348
Mingshan District	名山区	Míngshān Qū	254,632	614	415
Yingjing County	荥经县	Yíngjīng Xiàn	131,491	1,781	74
Hanyuan County	汉源县	Hànyuán Xiàn	285,558	2,349	122
Shimian County	石棉县	Shímián Xiàn	114,116	2,678	43
Tianquan County	天全县	Tiānquán Xiàn	132,033	2,394	55
Lushan County	芦山县	Lúshān Xiàn	99,824	1,364	73
Baoxing County	宝兴县	Bǎoxīng Xiàn	48,040	3,114	15

== Tourism and culture ==
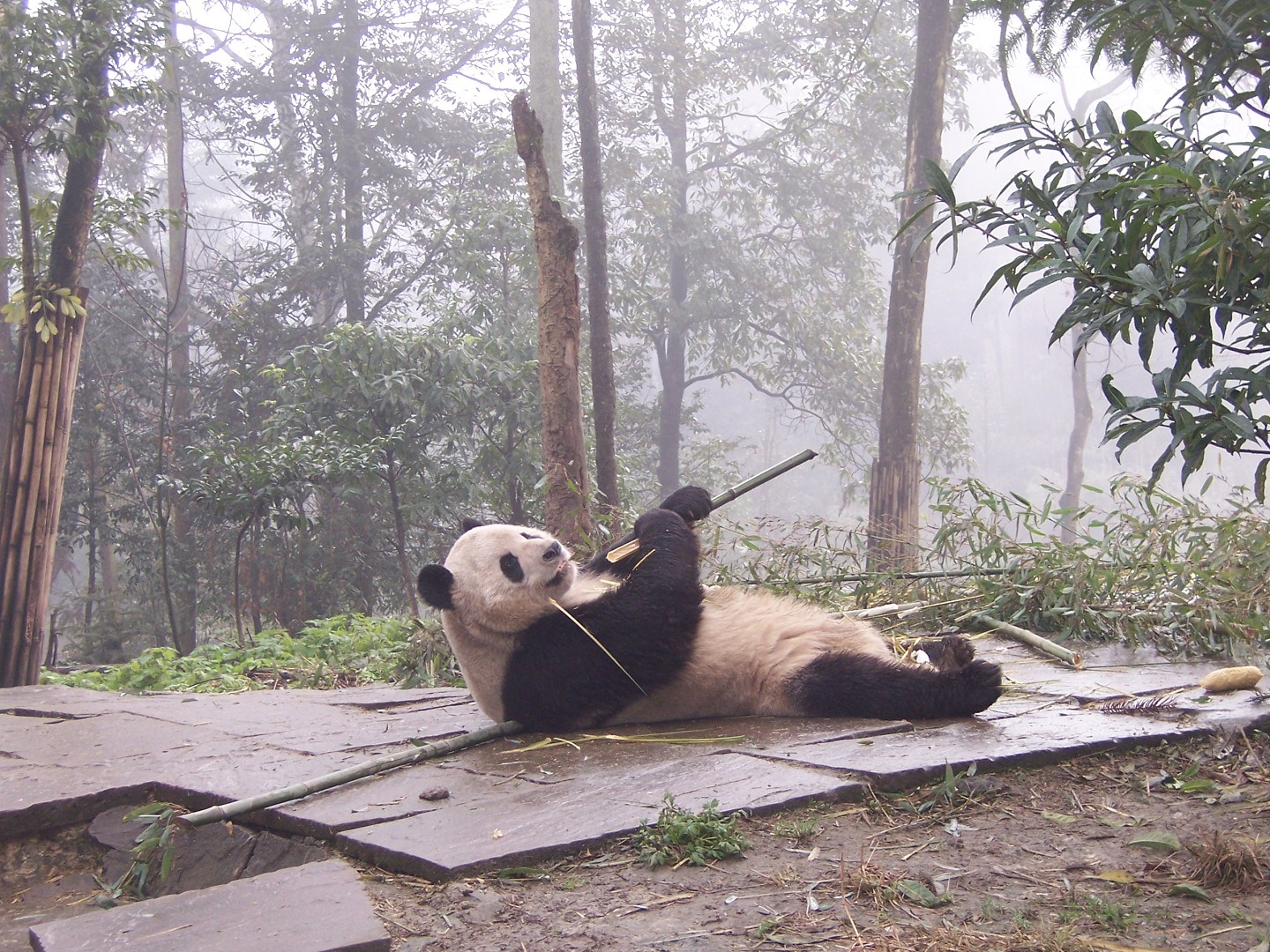
Giant panda at Bifengxia Panda Base

Tourism forms an important parts of the economy of Ya'an. The city is home to the Bifengxia Panda Base. The first panda specimen known to the western world was from Ya'an discovered by the Lazarist missionary Armand David.

The city is also famous for Ya fish, which is used in local cuisine. Ya'an is also the production base of Tibetan brick tea.

== Food/Specialty Products ==
Ya'an Tata Noodles: One of the most representative noodle dishes in Ya'an. It is characterized by its chewy noodles and spicy seasoning.

Ya Fish Clay Pot: A clay pot dish made with local "Ya fish" (cold-water fish). It boasts a delicious flavor and is a local signature dish.

Yingjing Bangbang Chicken: Spicy and fragrant, with tender meat; a representative local delicacy.

Zha Zha Mian: This type of noodle is made by processing and grinding buckwheat, mixing it with water to form a dough, and then pressing it into strips using a special tool before cooking. Hence, it is called Zha Zha Mian.

Cherries: Hanyuan cherries are a type of fruit that closely resembles cherries.

== Transport ==
- China National Highway 318
- G5 Beijing–Kunming Expressway
- G4218 Yaye Expressway
- G93 Chengyu Ring Expressway
- Sichuan–Tibet railway Chengdu-Ya'an section
- Ya'an railway station on the Sichuan–Tibet railway

== See also ==
- Baoxing County
- Xikang
