= Hanyuan County =

Hanyuan County 汉源县 • ꉴꑼꑤ • ཧན་ཡོན་རྫོང
- County
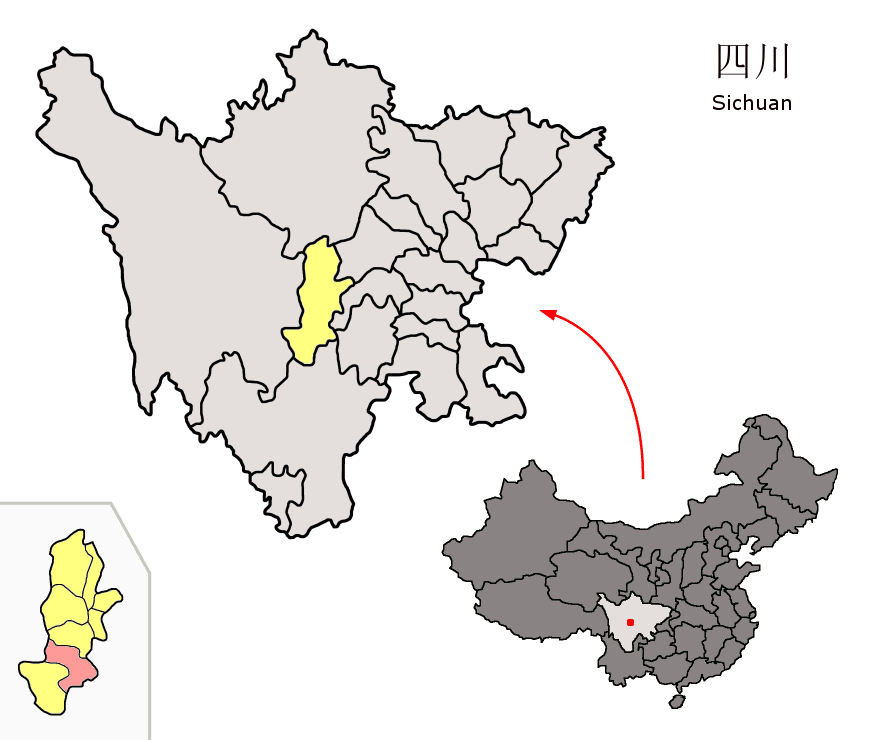
- Location of Hanyuan County (red) in Ya'an City (yellow) and Sichuan province

- Location of the seat in Sichuan
- Coordinates: 29.344°N 102.652°E
- Country: China
- Province: Sichuan
- Prefecture-level city: Ya'an
- County seat: Fulin Town

Area
  - Total: 2,349 km^{2} (907 sq mi)

Population (2020)
  - Total: 285,558
  - Density: 121.6/km^{2} (314.9/sq mi)
- Time zone: UTC+8 (China Standard)
- Website: www.hanyuan.gov.cn

Hanyuan County (simplified Chinese: 汉源县; traditional Chinese: 漢源縣; pinyin: Hànyuán Xiàn) is a county of Sichuan Province, China. It is under the administration of Ya'an city. The principal town is Shirong. The Pubugou Hydropower Station in the county has caused displacement problems for thousands of villagers, and in 2004 some 20,000 villagers protested against it.

== Administrative divisions ==
Hanyuan County administers 12 towns, 4 townships and 5 ethnic townships:

- Fulin Town (富林镇)
- Jiuxiang Town (九襄镇)
- Wusihe Town (乌斯河镇)
- Yidong Town (宜东镇)
- Fuzhuang Town (富庄镇)
- Qingxi Town (清溪镇)
- Dashu Town (大树镇)
- Huangmu Town (皇木镇)
- Tangjia Town (唐家镇)
- Fuquan Town (富泉镇)
- Anle Town (安乐镇)
- Qianyu Town (前域镇)
- Fuxiang Township (富乡乡)
- Malie Township (马烈乡)
- Henan Township (河南乡)
- Shaijing Township (晒经乡)
- Xiaopu Tibetan and Yi Ethnic Township (小堡藏族彝族乡; ཤའ་ཕུ་བོད་རིགས་ཡི་རིགས་ཞང shaʼ phu bod rigs yi rigs zhang; ꑦꁌꀒꋤꆈꌠꑢ xuo pu op zzup nuo su xiex)
- Pianma Yi Ethnic Township (片马彝族乡; ꀽꂸꆈꌠꑢ pie map nuo su xiex)
- Nimei Yi Ethnic Township (坭美彝族乡; ꆀꂿꆈꌠꑢ nip mo nuo su xiex)
- Yongli Yi Ethnic Township (永利彝族乡; ꑿꆀꆈꌠꑢ yo nip nuo su xiex)
- Shunhe Yi Ethnic Township (顺河彝族乡; ꎵꉼꆈꌠꊨꏦꏱꅉꑢ shop hop nuo su zyt jie jux dde xiex)

== Climate ==
Climate data for Hanyuan, elevation 1,098 m (3,602 ft), (1991–2020 normals, extremes 1981–2010)
Month	Jan	Feb	Mar	Apr	May	Jun	Jul	Aug	Sep	Oct	Nov	Dec	Year
Record high °C (°F)	20.9 (69.6)	32.6 (90.7)	35.6 (96.1)	36.8 (98.2)	39.2 (102.6)	37.1 (98.8)	38.7 (101.7)	38.8 (101.8)	38.5 (101.3)	32.8 (91.0)	25.7 (78.3)	20.6 (69.1)	39.2 (102.6)
Mean daily maximum °C (°F)	10.8 (51.4)	14.0 (57.2)	18.7 (65.7)	23.2 (73.8)	25.8 (78.4)	26.8 (80.2)	29.1 (84.4)	30.0 (86.0)	24.2 (75.6)	20.2 (68.4)	16.6 (61.9)	11.4 (52.5)	20.9 (69.6)
Daily mean °C (°F)	7.2 (45.0)	9.2 (48.6)	13.3 (55.9)	17.2 (63.0)	20.2 (68.4)	21.9 (71.4)	23.8 (74.8)	24.5 (76.1)	20.3 (68.5)	16.7 (62.1)	13.0 (55.4)	8.3 (46.9)	16.3 (61.3)
Mean daily minimum °C (°F)	4.8 (40.6)	6.0 (42.8)	9.8 (49.6)	13.4 (56.1)	16.6 (61.9)	18.8 (65.8)	20.6 (69.1)	21.1 (70.0)	17.9 (64.2)	14.5 (58.1)	10.7 (51.3)	6.2 (43.2)	13.4 (56.1)
Record low °C (°F)	−2.6 (27.3)	−2.3 (27.9)	−0.1 (31.8)	5.6 (42.1)	8.8 (47.8)	12.0 (53.6)	15.2 (59.4)	14.5 (58.1)	11.0 (51.8)	5.4 (41.7)	2.4 (36.3)	−1.6 (29.1)	−2.6 (27.3)
Average precipitation mm (inches)	1.3 (0.05)	2.4 (0.09)	24.7 (0.97)	48.1 (1.89)	69.3 (2.73)	115.0 (4.53)	180.7 (7.11)	160.6 (6.32)	104.0 (4.09)	37.6 (1.48)	6.0 (0.24)	1.7 (0.07)	751.4 (29.57)
Average precipitation days (≥ 0.1 mm)	1.2	2.4	8.9	13.8	15.2	19.6	20.1	16.3	21.0	14.0	4.3	1.6	138.4
Average snowy days	1.1	0.5	0	0	0	0	0	0	0	0	0	0.2	1.8
Average relative humidity (%)	57	56	60	64	67	77	78	74	80	76	66	61	68
Mean monthly sunshine hours	108.0	123.2	132.1	141.8	123.4	81.0	118.1	151.0	64.3	74.6	98.6	90.4	1,306.5
Percentage possible sunshine	33	39	35	37	29	19	28	37	17	21	31	29	30
Source: China Meteorological Administration

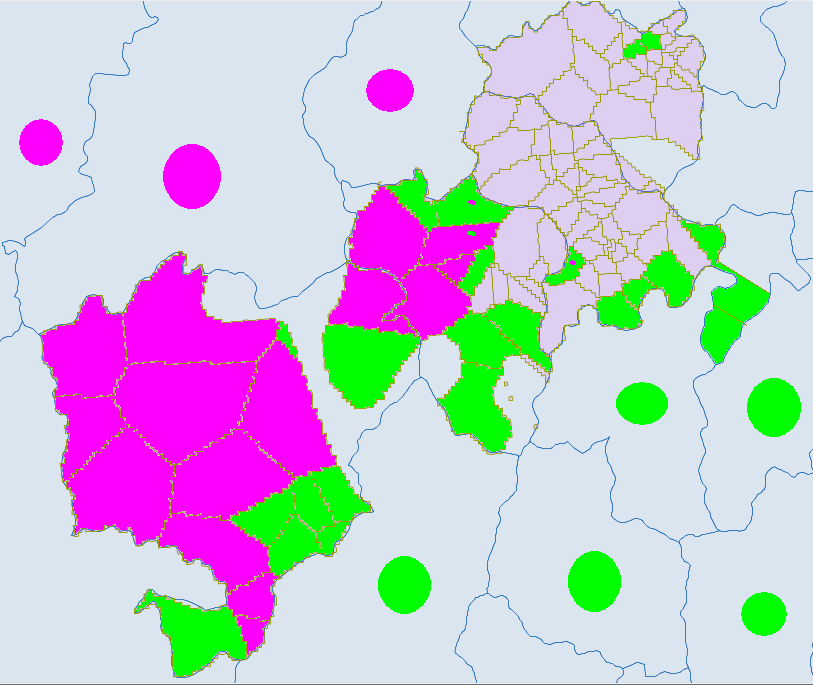
Light green -Yi. Red -Tibetan
