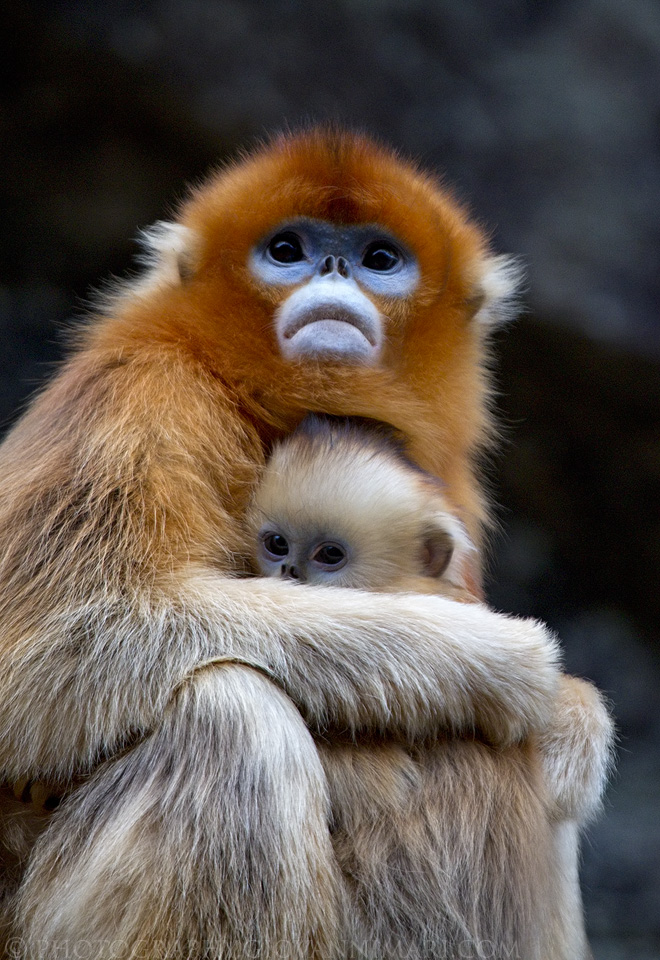

Conservation status
- Endangered (IUCN 3.1)
- CITES Appendix I

Scientific classification
- Kingdom: Animalia
- Phylum: Chordata
- Class: Mammalia
- Infraclass: Placentalia
- Order: Primates
- Family: Cercopithecidae
- Genus: Rhinopithecus
- Species: R. roxellana

Binomial name
- Rhinopithecus roxellana A. Milne-Edwards, 1870
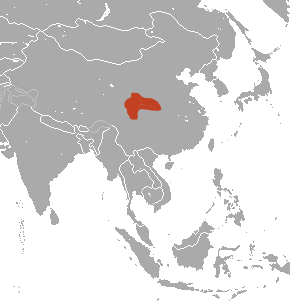
- Golden snub-nosed monkey range

= Golden snub-nosed monkey =

Species of Old World monkey

The golden snub-nosed monkey (Rhinopithecus roxellana) is an Old World monkey in the subfamily Colobinae. It is endemic to a small area in temperate, mountainous forests of central and Southwest China. They inhabit these mountainous forests of Southwestern China at elevations of 1,500–3,400 m (4,900–11,200 ft) above sea level. The Chinese name is Sichuan golden hair monkey (四川金丝猴). It is also widely referred to as the Sichuan snub-nosed monkey. Of the three species of snub-nosed monkeys in China, the golden snub-nosed monkey is the most widely distributed throughout China.

Snow occurs frequently within its range, and it can withstand colder average temperatures better than any other non-human primate. Its diet varies markedly with the seasons, but it is primarily a herbivore with lichens being its main food source. It is diurnal and largely arboreal, spending some 97% of its time in the canopy. There are three subspecies. Population estimates range from 8,000 to 15,000 and it is threatened by habitat loss.

== Taxonomy ==
Biologists presently identify three subspecies of this monkey, which can be distinguished primarily by the length of their tails, as well as by certain skeletal and dental features. The dense human settlement of much of eastern Sichuan and the Han River valley of southern Shaanxi creates geographical separation between the three subspecies.

- Moupin golden snub-nosed monkey, Rhinopithecus roxellana roxellana. This subspecies is found in the mountainous areas flanking the Sichuan Basin from the west and north. According to the estimates made between 1995 and 2006, the population includes some 10,000 individuals, living mostly in Sichuan. Of them, some 6,000 lived in the Min Mountains of northern Sichuan, 3,500 in the Qionglai Mountains further west, and 500 in the Daxiangling and Xiaoxiangling ranges of south-central Sichuan. Smaller groups are also found just north of Sichuan border, in the border counties of Gansu (Wen County; about 800 individuals in eight troops) and Shaanxi (Ningqiang County, about 170–200 individuals in one or two troops).
- Qinling golden snub-nosed monkey, Rhinopithecus roxellana qinlingensis. According to an estimate published in 2001, this subspecies included some 3,800-4,000 individuals (about half of them adults) in 39 in Qinling Mountains of southern Shaanxi. The Qinling Mountains are separated from the more southern Min–Daba Mountains belt by the wide and comparatively densely populated Han River valley.
- Hubei golden snub-nosed monkey, Rhinopithecus roxellana hubeiensis. Members of this subspecies reside in the Daba Mountains (in particular, their Shennongjia section) of the westernmost Hubei (Shennongjia Forest District, Fang, Xingshan and Badong counties) and the northeastern Chongqing Municipality. (Note: Chongqing Municipality was separated from Sichuan Province in 1997, and included much of Sichuan's part of the Daba Mountains, and all of former Sichuan–Hubei border. Thus older sources referring to the "northeastern Sichuan" may often mean counties transferred to the new Chongqing Municipality.) According to a 1998 estimate, the population included 600–1,000 individuals in five to six troops. In 2005, the management of the Shennongjia Nature Reserve reported that the population had grown between 1990 and 2005 from 500 to over 1200.

== Physical characteristics ==
The adult and subadult golden snub-nosed monkey is sexually dimorphic.

Adult males (estimated at over 7 years of age) have large bodies covered with very long, golden guard hairs on their backs and cape area. The crest is medium brown while the back, crown to nape, arms and outer thighs are deep brown. The brown crest also contains physically upright hairs, whose shape is useful for individual identification. Also, when their mouths are open, researchers can observe long canines. They are usually between 58 cm and 68 cm and weigh about 16.4 kg.

Subadult males (estimated at 5–7 years of age) have a similar sized body as the fully developed male adult, but have a more slender body. The golden guard hairs on the cape are short and sparse, and their median brown crests show microbanding, while also turning from a brown color.

Adult females (estimated at over 5 years of age) are smaller in size and are about half the size of adult males. The dorsum, crown to nape, cape, arms and outer thighs are brown to deep brown in some of the older females. However, golden guard hairs are also present on the back and cape area, but they are shorter in length than in the males. The brown crest shows microbanding. Their breasts and nipples are large and easily visible which is also useful for identification. After pregnancy, it is common to observe infants and newborns hanging beneath the abdomen of females when they are climbing or walking. They are usually between 47 cm and 52 cm and weigh about 9.4 kg.

Subadult females (estimated at 3–4 years old) are smaller than adult females and are about two-thirds the size. The body hair is brown, gradually turning golden but lacking the golden guard hairs. Their median brown crest also shows microbanding. Their breasts and nipples are also not as large as they are in adult females.

Juveniles (ranging from at least 1 year of age to 3 years old) are quite small, being less than two-thirds the size of adult females. Their body hair is light brown, gradually turning reddish gold. The rest of their body (dorsum, crown to nape, cape, arms and outer thighs) hair is brown. Golden hairs in the dorsum or cape area are not recognizable nor is the median brown crest present in subadult to adult females and males. Sexual determination is difficult because their external genital organs are underdeveloped.

Infants (estimated at 3 months to 1 year old) are light brownish gray or light brown, appearing white in sunlight. They are often observed playing with juveniles or other infants, but are noted to spend most of their time beside their mothers or sucking milk. They are also observed clinging from the front of their mothers (primarily the lower abdomen) for protection, feeding, and nurturing. Their sex of the individual cannot be distinguished at this point of time as well as in Newborns.

Newborn babies (estimated at less than 3 months of age) are dark to light gray. They turn light brownish grey after about 2 months. They are also observed rarely leaving their mothers or other females carrying them, known as alloparenting. Sex at this time is indistinguishable.

== Habitat and distribution ==
The distribution of the golden snub-nosed monkey is limited to temperate forests on mountains in four provinces in China: Sichuan, Gansu, Shaanxi, and Hubei. This monkey is found at elevations of 1,500-3,400 m. Within this area, vegetation varies with altitude from deciduous, broadleaf forests at low elevations to mixed coniferous, broadleaf forests above 2,200 m and coniferous forests above 2,600 m. Average annual temperature is 6.4 °C (43.5 °F) with a minimum of −8.3 °C (17.1 °F) in January and a maximum of 21.7 °C (71.1 °F) in July.

Home range size varies seasonally. The change in home range size and location is dependent upon the availability and distribution of food. The total area covered by seasonal home ranges is surprisingly large for a species. One of the largest home ranges found covered 40 square kilometres (15 sq mi).

== Behavior ==
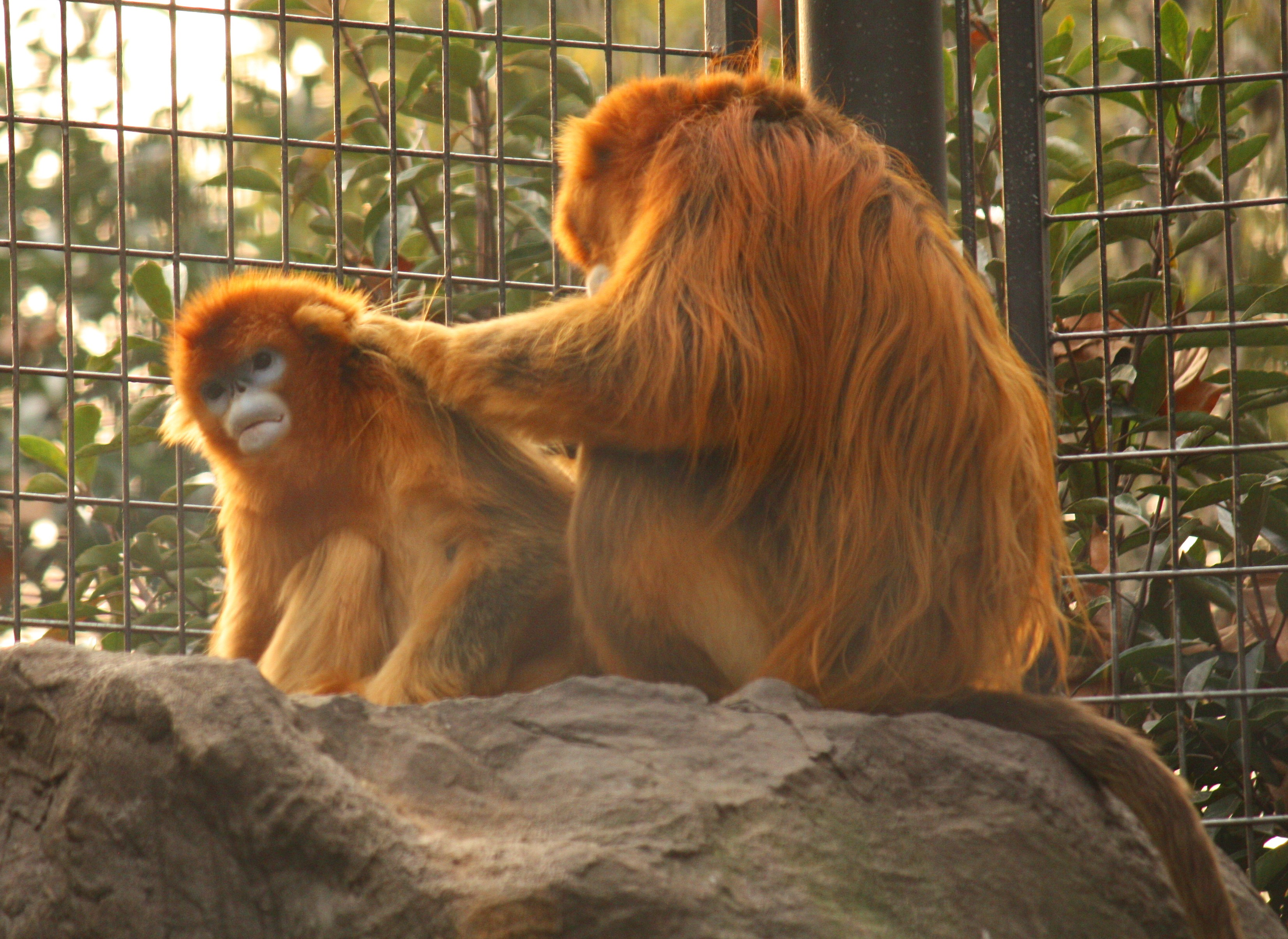
Female and male in Shanghai Zoo

The golden snub-nosed monkey is found in groups ranging in size from 5–10 individuals to bands of about 600. The social organization of this species can be quite complex. The one-male-units (OMUs) are the basic social unit within groups of golden snub-nosed monkeys with many of the OMUs forming a bigger group. These multi-tier societies consist of several OMUs that include one adult male plus a number of adult females and their offspring. Some observers have even come to conclude that these large foraging groups are multi-male and multi-female societies.

The male may stay solitary, often remaining away from the rest of the group members as they rest. Adult females tend to socialize more with one another than with other males or juveniles. Group members remain close to one another, interactions between different OMUs often result in confrontations. Females of the golden snub-nosed monkey are usually observed to form several close associations with other females. However, in conflicts against other units in the surrounding site, both males and females support each other, while also protecting their young (usually observed at a distance by putting the young in the center of the pack). Unusually for a harem-forming species, infanticide by males is averted. Female snub-nose monkeys will deliberately have "affairs" with all resident males in the surrounding area behind the harem-master's back, which in turn creates paternity confusion and means newly established alpha males will not risk killing what could be their own offspring. In turn females will have more reproductive success and less infant losses.

Protecting the young is a group effort. Mothers often have helpers assisting them with the care of their young. When faced with danger from a predator such as the northern goshawk (Accipiter gentilis), the young are placed at the center of the group while the stronger adult males go to the scene of the alarm. The rest of the day, the members of the group remain closer to one another with the young protected at the center.

There is little information available on the sleeping cluster patterns of the Sichuan snub-nosed monkeys. However, in a detailed observation of the free-ranging band in the Qinling Mountains in central China, results have suggested that winter night activity of Rhinopithecus roxellana is a compromise between antipredator and thermoregulatory strategies and an adaptation to ecological conditions of their temperate habitat. Keeping warm is critical for survival in freezing temperatures, but their thick coats can provide this warmth as well as sleeping in these clusters. Monkeys often sleep in the lower stratum of the tree canopy, avoiding the upper canopy where it is cold and windy. They form larger sleeping clusters at night than in the daytime. The most common types of night-sleeping clusters were adult females and their young, followed by adult females with other adult females. Adult males are usually observed sleeping by themselves or on the lookout for predators or dangers.

There are several hypotheses to explain the formation of sleeping clusters, the most important one being a thermoregulatory process. The thermoregulatory hypothesis suggests that a primary function of sleeping in clusters is the conservation of heat during cold temperatures. Along with thermoregulation, safety from predators is an important principle underlying the formation of sleeping clusters in primates. This antipredation hypothesis suggest that increased cohesion and large sleeping congregations might facilitate predator detection and enhance group defense.

=== Reproduction ===
Females are sexually mature at about 5 years old. Males are sexually mature at about 5–7 years old. Mating may occur throughout the year but peaks in the month of October. This approximates gestation at 6–7 months in length. The golden snub-nosed monkey gives birth from March to June.

In primate research, although male–male competition for mates and female mate choice are the common causes of sexual selection, female–female competition over males is especially important in polygynous species. The Sichuan snub-nosed monkey is a seasonal breeding species of colobine endemic to China, and lives in a multi-level social system. Because the basic social and reproductive unit is the harem or one male unit (OMU), which consists of a single resident male, a number of adult females, sub-adult females, juveniles and infants, it has been suggested that sexual competition in this polygynous species is skewed. Females faced with multiple competitors will exhibit a high level of sexual competition, while the single resident male will not experience within-group sexual competition. They also have up to 3 babies.

=== Diet ===
The golden snub-nosed monkey eats (from greatest to least amount) lichens, young leaves, fruits or seeds, buds, mature leaves, herbs, bark, and flowers. This diet varies from season to season, showing a correlation once again between food availability and home range. This diet also shows a complicated seasonal variation. The monthly diet of monkeys at Shennongjia Nature Reserve varies from primarily lichen eater between November and April, to a mixture of folivore and lichen eater from May to July, and to a mixture of frugivore (or seed eater) and lichen eater or primarily lichen eater between August and October. For this seasonal variation, the amount of lichens consumed appears to decrease in the summer with the greater availability of fruit or seeds. The monkeys' preferred lichen species seem to grow on Cerasus discadenia, Salix wallichiana, and Malus halliana. Lichens are found in great profusion on dead trees. Monkeys at Qingmuchuan Nature Reserve have not been observed feeding on lichen; during the winter they feed mostly on leaves, bark, and buds, and during the summer they feed mostly on the fruit of the giant dogwood.

This primate prefers to forage in larger trees of a tree species, and spends most of the time using primary forest and young forest, rarely uses shrub forest and does not use grassland. Even though they primarily forage in the trees and sometimes on the ground, they have several predators, including both mammals, such as dhole (Cuon alpinus), wolf (Canis lupus), Asiatic golden cat (Catopuma temmincki), and leopard (Panthera pardus), and birds, like golden eagle (Aquila chrysaetos) and northern goshawk (Accipiter gentilis).

=== Social structures ===
The fundamental level of social organization is the one-male, multifemale social unit (OMU), which contains a single breeding male, several breeding females (harem) and their offspring. There also exist all-male units (AMU), in which several bachelor males reside together. Many of these are juvenile and sub-adult males who transferred directly into the AMU from their natal OMU. In some cases adult AMU members are previous residential males of an OMU. AMU members are characterized by an age-graded dominance hierarchy and kin relationships. Solitary males are principally adults who have been replaced as breeding males in their OMU. However they may transfer into an all-male band or follow the breeding band and try to take over an OMU from the residential male. The breeding band is an aggregation of OMUs that coordinate their daily activity. Although they feed, forage, rest and travel together in a coordinated manner, members of different OMUs within the breeding band rarely engage in social interactions. The all-male band is composed of 1–3 AMUs that are socially distinct from each other but coordinate their activities in close spatial proximity. The herd is composed of an associated breeding band, all-male band and solitary males. The troop is composed of two or more herds in a large home range. Individuals and OMUs have been observed to transfer between herds of this multilevel society.

=== Communication ===
==== Non-vocal communication ====
Among all nonhuman primates, communication is a vital resource used to locate resources, find members within a troop, as well as defend and protect against predators. Communication comes especially in handy in areas with dense vegetation leading to low visibility, much like the temperate arboreal habitats in which the golden snub-nosed monkeys are often found residing in. Communication is very prominent in social animal species and appears in different forms. Non-vocal communication is possible through the process of an animal being able to read the facial structures of others in its species. These monkeys have been documented with the learned ability to comprehend and reply to distinct facial cues given by others in their troop. This is an ability that comes around the age of 3 and begins with the recognition of neutral, happy, and angry faces made by the monkey's mother through ontogenetic development. This can be helpful in ensuring food security, social adaptation, and safety from predators. This process protects against infanticide by the species developing the unique evolutionary ability to cognitively deal with a relationship forming between the dominant male and offspring of a separate individual in the same OMU. The dominant male adopts the two offspring at the same time, despite one of them not being biologically related to him, helping to defend against infanticide within this species.

==== Vocal communication ====
Beyond non-verbal, facial recognition as a form of communication, golden snub-nosed monkeys have a variety of vocal calls in order to communicate. This is especially helpful in those low-visibility forests the monkeys spend their time in. Vocalizations of different species evolve and adapt to the environment they are found in. For instance, in more dense forests where individuals are not within close proximity of each other the vocalizations evolve to travel further distances. They are often short bursts, being more discrete, but clear because these vocalizations need to be able to be understood without the assistance of visual cues. Though there have not been many studies done on the vocalizations of golden snub-nosed monkeys, based on data gained from Fan et al. 2018 in the wild, and other studies done on captive monkeys by Tenza et al. 1988, it is believed that vocal communication is very important among the complex social structures of golden snub-nosed monkeys. These vocalizations come in a range of ways including 2 or 3 call sequences that contained messages that were either cryptic, non-cryptic, or threatening. It was found that the type and frequency of certain calls was impacted by the sex of the individual. This is common among sexually dimorphic species as body size and sex can have a major impact on the type of calls that can be produced. The major categories of calls discovered were amazement calls, alarm calls, warning calls, peaceful calls, and contacting calls. All of these vocalizations were presented through either shrills or bawls, but chucks, whines, and grunts were also detected.

== Conservation ==
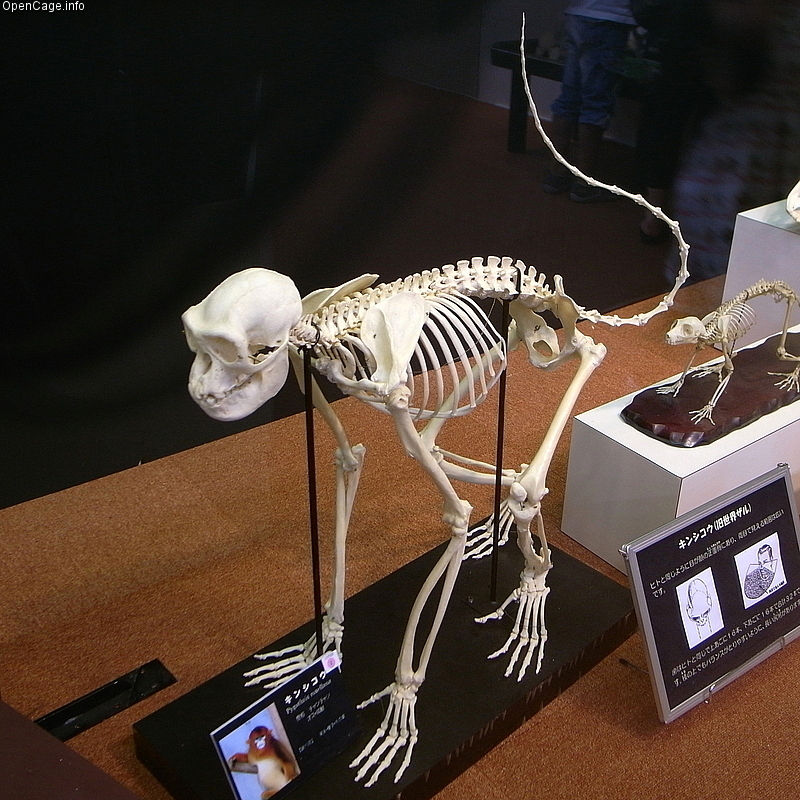
A skeleton of the species.

The golden snub-nosed monkey is endangered due to habitat loss. For instance, lichens are the main staple of the monkey's diet and dead trees have the greatest lichen coverage. Unfortunately, dead trees are harvested, thus reducing the quality of the habitat and availability of food. The monkey is a highly selective feeder, so damage to its habitat seriously impacts the species.

This primate is found in a number of protected areas, including Baihe Nature Reserve, Foping National Nature Reserve, Shennongjia National Geopark, and Wanglang National Nature Reserve. The golden snub-nosed monkey is also listed on Appendix I of the Convention on International Trade in Endangered Species (CITES) meaning that international trade in this species is prohibited.

In 2004, the endangered aspect of this monkey was publicized in a postage stamp issued by Guernsey Post.

== In captivity ==
The San Francisco Zoo kept this species in 1985, and the San Diego Zoo kept the species from 1984 to 1989. Outside Mainland China, only Hong Kong, Japan, and South Korea currently keep golden-snub nosed monkeys. In 2025, the ZooParc de Beauval in France became the first zoo outside Asia to house golden snub-nosed monkeys.

== See also ==
- List of endangered and protected species of China
- Wildlife of China
