= Daliang Mountains =

Mountain range in Sichuan, China

- 大凉山
- Location within China Location within Sichuan

Highest point
- Peak: Shizi Mountain (狮子山)
- Elevation: 4,076 m (13,373 ft)
- Coordinates: 27°53′39″N 103°14′14″E

Geography
- Location: Sichuan, China

The Daliang Mountains (Chinese: 大涼山; pinyin: Dàliángshān; lit. 'big cold mountain') are in the southern part of the province of Sichuan in China. The Daliang rises above the left bank of the Jinsha (Upper Yangtze) River, opposite the Wulian Feng in Yunnan Province. This part of the Jinsha River is the last portion to flow through mountainous terrain before entering the Sichuan Basin where the river becomes known as the Yangtze at Yibin. The Daliang are located within eastern Liangshan Prefecture, southern Leshan Prefecture, and western Yibin Prefecture.

The highest peak of the range is Shizi Mountain (狮子山) at 4,076 m (13,373 ft).

The Chengdu–Kunming Railway passes to the west of Daliang Range, below the Xiaoxiang Range.
