= Guizhou Plateau broadleaf and mixed forests =

Ecoregion in Guizhou Plateau, China

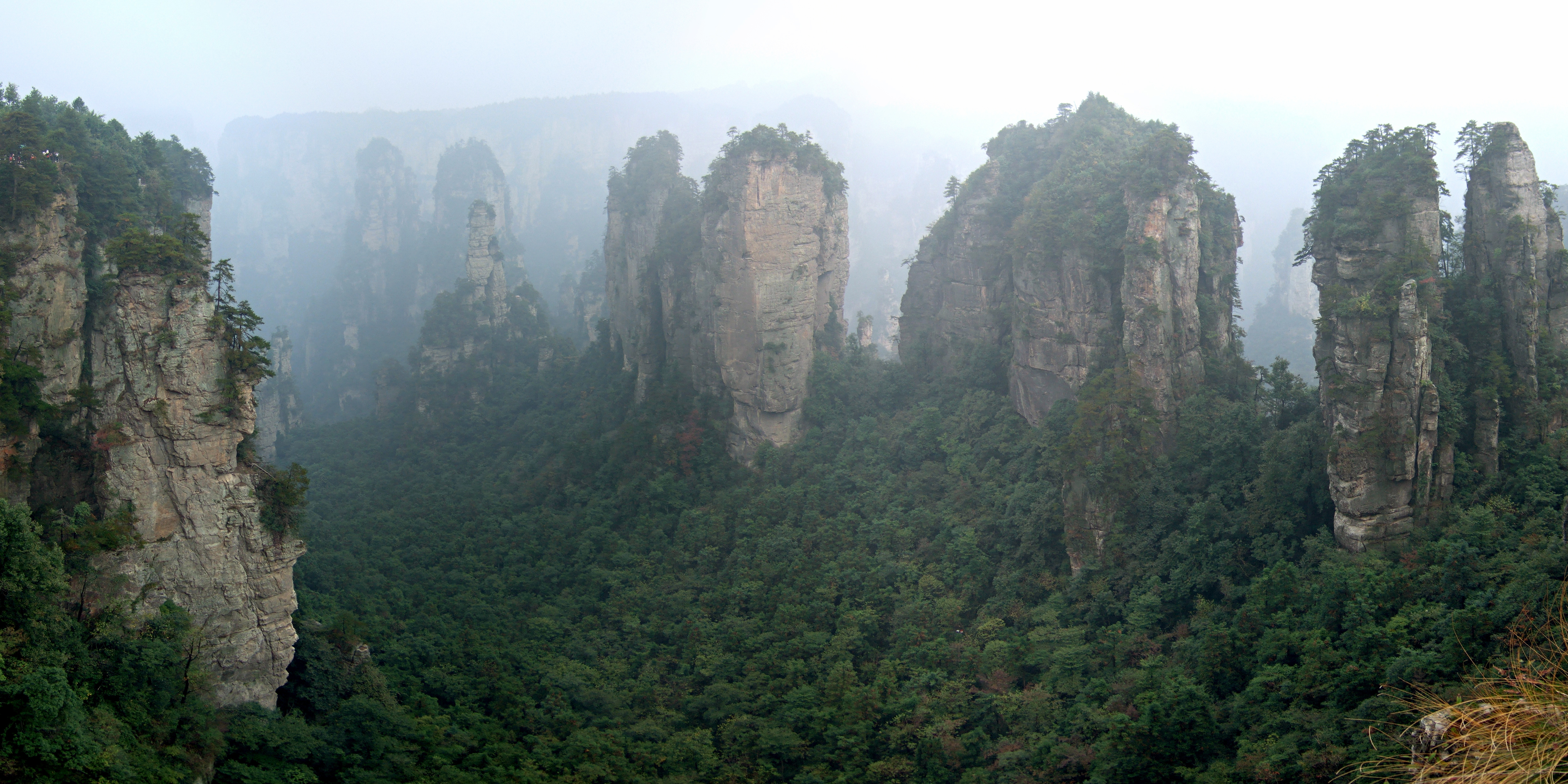
- Broadleaf and mixed forests on karst topography in Wulingyuan

- Location of ecoregion

Ecology
- Realm: Palearctic
- Biome: tropical and subtropical moist broadleaf forests
- Borders: List: Changjiang Plain evergreen forests; Daba Mountains evergreen forests; Jian Nan subtropical evergreen forests; Qionglai-Minshan conifer forests; Sichuan Basin evergreen broadleaf forests; Yunnan Plateau subtropical evergreen forests

Geography
- Area: 269,600 km^{2} (104,100 sq mi)
- Country: China
- Provinces: Chongqing; Guizhou; Hubei; Hunan; Sichuan, Yunnan

The Guizhou Plateau broadleaf and mixed forests are a subtropical moist broadleaf forest ecoregion in the Yungui Plateau of China. Much of the original forest has been replaced by secondary forests.

== Geography ==
The Guizhou Plateau broadleaf and mixed forests occupy the eastern portion of the Yungui Plateau. The forests are found throughout most of Guizhou province, extreme northeastern Yunnan, southeastern Sichuan, southeastern Chongqing, southwestern Hubei, and western Hunan.

The geology in this part of the Yungui Plateau is composed of mostly Paleozoic limestone where there are poor quality soils and extreme karst topography. Human development in this part of China has been limited due to the nature of terrain where large pits, caves, natural arches, and disappearing rivers are not uncommon.

== Flora ==
Despite the high level of precipitation, flora in this ecoregion is prone to drought stress because karstic soils here are porous and do not retain water. In the northern parts of the Guizhou Plateau ecoregion, Chinese red pine is a major species while Yunnan pine dominates in the south. Broadleaf taxa include Rhododendron, Quercus, Sterculia, Erythrina, Ficus, Eugenia, and Helicia.

The first-class protected plant species in the Guizhou Plateau broadleaf and mixed forests are Cathaya argyrophylla, Taiwania flousiana, Cyathea spinulosa, and the revered Davidia involucrata.

== Fauna ==
The Guizhou snub-nosed monkey is endemic to this ecoregion. Other notable animal species include the Assamese macaque, Francois’ leaf monkey, clouded leopard, leopard, tiger, Sika deer, and red goral.

== Conservation ==
While much of the original subtropical evergreen broadleaf forests in this ecoregion has been extirpated due to habitat conversion, secondary forests, seasonal tropical forests, and conifer forests now dominate. Remaining tracts of the original forest vegetation can still be found in protected areas and along inaccessible hills. Protected areas include Wulingyuan, Mount Fanjing, and Zhangjiajie.
