= Nama Peak =

- 那玛峰 (Chinese)
- Location within Sichuan

Highest point
- Elevation: 5,588 m (18,333 ft)
- Prominence: 338 m (1,109 ft)
- Parent peak: Gongba Peak (贡巴峰), 5,614 m
- Isolation: 5.17 km (3.21 mi)
- Coordinates: 29.6186°N 101.812°E

Naming
- Native name: Nochma (Standard Tibetan)

Geography
- Location: Sichuan, China
- Parent range: Daxue Mountains

Climbing
- First ascent: April 2001 (German duo)
- Easiest route: South face, southeast ridge (mixed)

Nama Peak, (Note: Chinese: 那玛峰; Pinyin: Nàmǎ Fēng) or Mount Nama, is a 5,588 metre side peak about 8 km to the west-northwest of the main summit of Minya Konka, the highest mountain of the Daxue Mountains, itself a part of the Hengduan Mountains.

The peak lies within Kangding city. The whole mountain is under the administration of Garze Tibetan Autonomous Prefecture in Sichuan, China, being about 250 km from the provincial capital of Chengdu.

== Climbing ==
Nama Peak was first climbed by a German couple in late April 2001. Not long ago, it did not have an official name. Only in recent years, due to its relative ease and clear view of the 3,000 m high west face of Mt. Gongga, the ascent has now become a popular destination for amateur climbers. Climbing season is from April to June, and from September to November.

From Chengdu (430 m altitude), the drive to Caoke Township (1,500 m) takes about five hours. Subsequent rides and short hikes reach Lower Zimei village (3,500 m). A 7 km hike leads to base camp (4,200 m), from which it takes about two days to Nama peak. Summit attempts are usually made from Camp 1 (C1, 4,850 m), 4 km from base camp and 8 km to the summit.

Because of a 50 m long crevasse, climbing permits were temporarily put on hold in 2024.

On 25 September 2025, a man fell to his death after having untied his safety rope while trying to take pictures.
