= Xiaoxiang (disambiguation) =

Xiaoxiang refers to the "lakes and rivers" region in south-central China, corresponding roughly to Hunan province.

Xiaoxiang may also refer to:

- Xiaoxiang poetry, Chinese poetic genre
- Xiaoxiang Range (小相岭), mountain range in Sichuan Province, China
- Xiaoxiang, Guangdong (小湘镇), town in Gaoyao District, Guangdong, China
- Xiaoxiang Reservoir (潇湘水库), reservoir in Qilin District, Qujing, Yunnan province, China
- Xiaoxiang Island (小庠岛), island in Pingtan County, Fujian province, China
