= Quercus obscura =

Quercus obscura can refer to the following plant species:

- Quercus obscura Seemen, a synonym of Quercus engleriana Seemen
- Quercus obscura Trel., a synonym of Quercus laeta Liebm.
