= Jiang Nan subtropical evergreen forests =

Ecoregion in Southern China

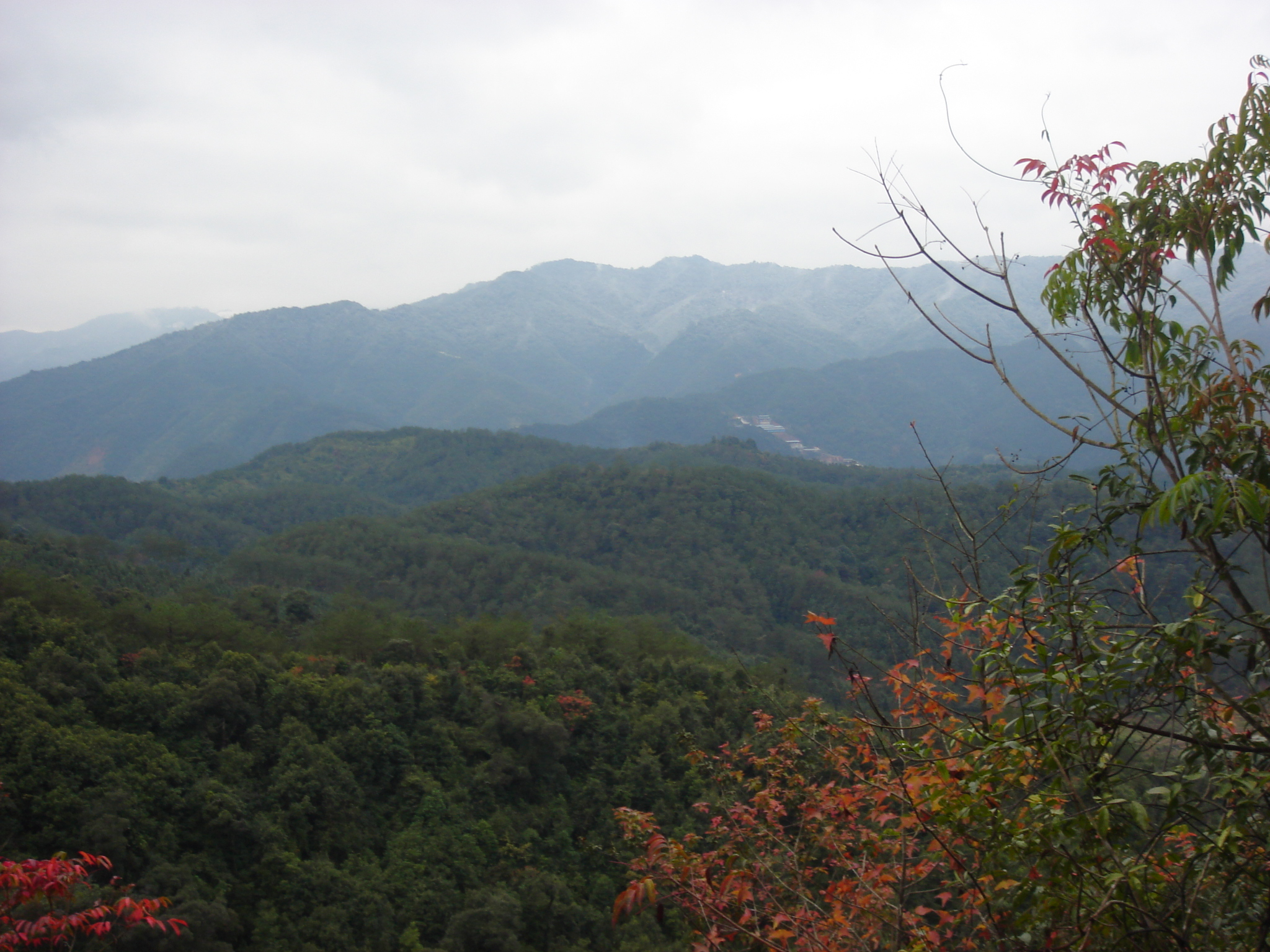
- A forest scene of Xibin town, Youxi County

- Ecoregion territory (in purple)

Ecology
- Realm: Indomalayan realm
- Biome: Tropical and subtropical moist broadleaf forests
- Borders: Changjiang Plain evergreen forests; Guizhou Plateau broadleaf and mixed forests; South China-Vietnam subtropical evergreen forests; Yunnan Plateau subtropical evergreen forests

Geography
- Area: 663,555 km^{2} (256,200 sq mi)
- Country: China
- Provinces: Fujian; Guangdong; Guangxi; Guizhou; Hunan; Jiangxi, Zhejiang
- Coordinates: 25°15′N 113°15′E

Conservation
- Protected: 0.5%

The Jiang Nan subtropical evergreen forests ecoregion (WWF ID: IM0118) covers the mountainous divide between the lower Yangtze River and the coastal plain of South China. The region is also a climatic divide between the temperate valleys of the north and the subtropical forests of the south. The region is important for biodiversity and endemic species. The rugged limestone karst hills have been relatively protected from conversion to agriculture, and support specialized plant and animal communities.

== Location and description ==
The ecoregion ranges over the Nanling Mountains of Southern China, from the Yunnan–Guizhou Plateau in the west, to the coast of the South China Sea in the east. The mountains separate the lower Yangtze River watershed to the north from the coastal plain to the south. Parts of the mountains sit on granite, but much of the region is limestone, with distinctive pinnacles and karst terrain. Elevations range from 500 meters to 1,500 meters.

== Climate ==
The climate of the ecoregion is Humid subtropical climate, hot wet summer (Köppen climate classification (Cfa)). This climate is characterized by large seasonal temperature differentials. No month averages below 0 °C (32 °F), at least one month averages above 22 °C (72 °F), and four months average over 10 °C (50 °F). Precipitation is generally highest in the summer.

== Flora ==
The forests of the region are subtropical, characterized by evergreen chinquapin (Castanopsis), oak (Quercus), and Schima (an evergreen member of the tea tree family, Theaceae); Laurels are common in the understory. Elevations over 1,000 meters feature semi-deciduous forests dominated by ring-cupped oak (Quercus glauca), Cinnamomum, Chinese elm (Ulmus parvifolia), and Bridelia. Bamboo is also an important plant in the regional forests. Most of the lowland forests have been cleared.

== Fauna ==
The area supports a number of vulnerable mammals, including the critically endangered white-headed langur (Trachypithecus poliocephalus leucocephalus), the endangered François' langur (T. francoisi), and the near-threatened mainland serow (Capricornis milneedwardsii). Over 400 species of birds have been recorded in the ecoregion.

== Protected areas ==
0.5% of the ecoregion is in protected areas. Protected areas include Kinmen National Park, Fujian Zhangjiangkou National Mangrove Nature Reserve, and Tian Tai Shan, Qingyuanshan, Tailaoshan, and Gui Ping West Hill scenic areas.

== See also ==
- List of ecoregions in China
