= Mount Gongga =

Mountain in Sichuan, China

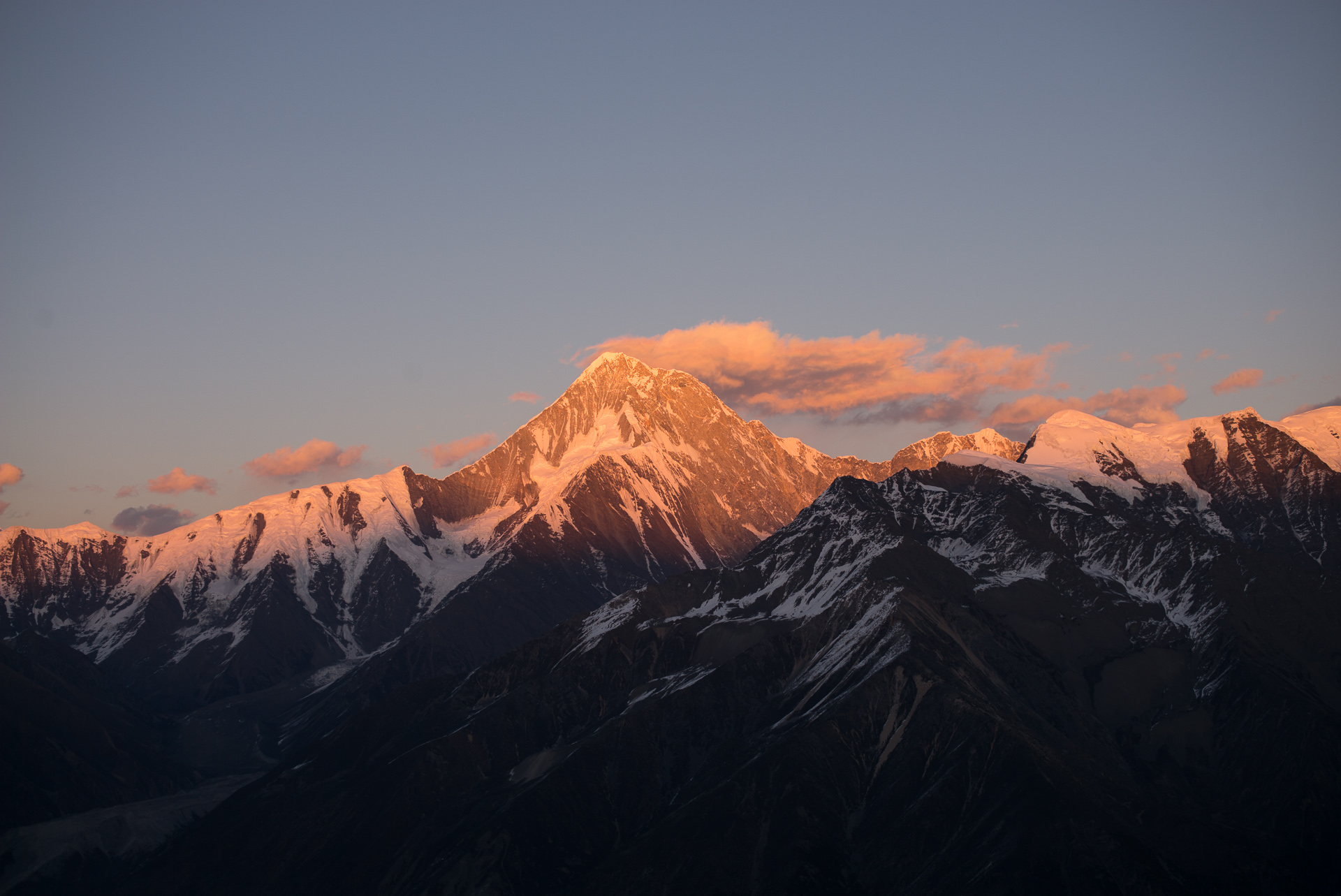
- West face of Mount Gongga

Highest point
- Elevation: 7,509 m (24,636 ft); Ranked 41st
- Prominence: 3,642 m (11,949 ft); Ranked 47th
- Parent peak: K2
- Listing: Ultra
- Coordinates: 29°35′45″N 101°52′45″E

Geography
- Location within Sichuan
- Location: Kangding and Luding County, Garzê Tibetan Autonomous Prefecture, Sichuan, China
- Parent range: Daxue Shan (大雪山)

Climbing
- First ascent: October 28, 1932, by Terris Moore and Richard Burdsall
- Easiest route: Northwest Ridge

Mount Gongga (simplified Chinese: 贡嘎山; traditional Chinese: 貢嘎山; pinyin: Gònggā Shān), also known as Minya Konka (Khams Tibetan: མི་ཉག་གངས་དཀར་རི་བོ་, Khams Tibetan pinyin: Mi'nyâg Gong'ga Riwo) and nicknamed "The King of Sichuan Mountains", is the highest mountain in Sichuan province, China. It has an elevation of 7,509 m (24,636 ft) above sea level, as surveyed by the Ministry of Natural Resources in November 2023. The name Gongga means "white snow [mountain]" in Tibetan, while Mi'nyag/Minya refers to the cultural region around the mountain. Mount Gongga is the easternmost and most isolated 7,000-metre (23,000 ft) peak in the world. It is situated in the Daxue Shan mountain range, between the Dadu and Yalong rivers, and is part of the Hengduan mountainous region. The peak has large vertical relief over the deep gorges nearby.

== Geography ==
Mount Gongga is located in the Daxue Mountains at the eastern edge of the Tibetan Plateau. The mountain rises 6,400 metres (21,000 ft) above the Dadu River valley 29 kilometres (18 mi) to the east, one of the largest elevation differences on earth.

The mountain consists of granodiorite that has been shaped by glacial activities. Five major glaciers originate from Mount Gongga, namely Yanzigou, Hailuogou, Mozigou, Gongba and Bawang. The 14.2-kilometre (8.8 mi)-long Hailuogou, the longest glacier, extends to its lowest point at an altitude of 2,850 metres (9,350 ft), and is home to China's largest icefall. On the main peak, glacial erosion formed 4 narrow, steep ridges at slope angles of up to 70°.

Mount Gongga's elevation was given as 7,556 metres (24,790 ft) in the 1972 Chinese national primary topographic map, which remains the most widely cited height for the mountain. However, the figure was based on a 1966 aerial survey alone, without any on-site measurement. The peak's steepness resulted in a large margin of error for the aerial mapping results. In 1982–83, the Lanzhou Institute of Glaciology and Cryopedology of the Chinese Academy of Sciences conducted a two-year survey of the Gongga region. The results, published in Map of Glaciers of Mount Gongga (1985), determined the elevation of the summit to be 7,514 metres (24,652 ft). In 2023, the Ministry of Natural Resources and the National Forestry and Grassland Administration calculated a new height of 7,508.9 metres (24,635 ft) using a combination of GNSS static survey and space photogrammetry methods. Apart from improved survey accuracy, the 2008 Sichuan earthquake and ice melting due to climate change may also have contributed to the change in height.

== Culture ==
Mount Gongga forms part of the traditional cultural boundary between the Han and Yi people to the east and the Tibetans to the west. The Gongga region is home to the Mi'nyag Tibetans (hence the name Mi'nyag Gongga), who speak the Mi'nyag or Muya language.

The Old Gongga Monastery, established in the mid-13th century to the west of the mountain, often serves as the base camp for mountaineers. Both the peak and the Gongba valley, where the monastery is located, are considered sacred to the local population.

== Flora and fauna ==
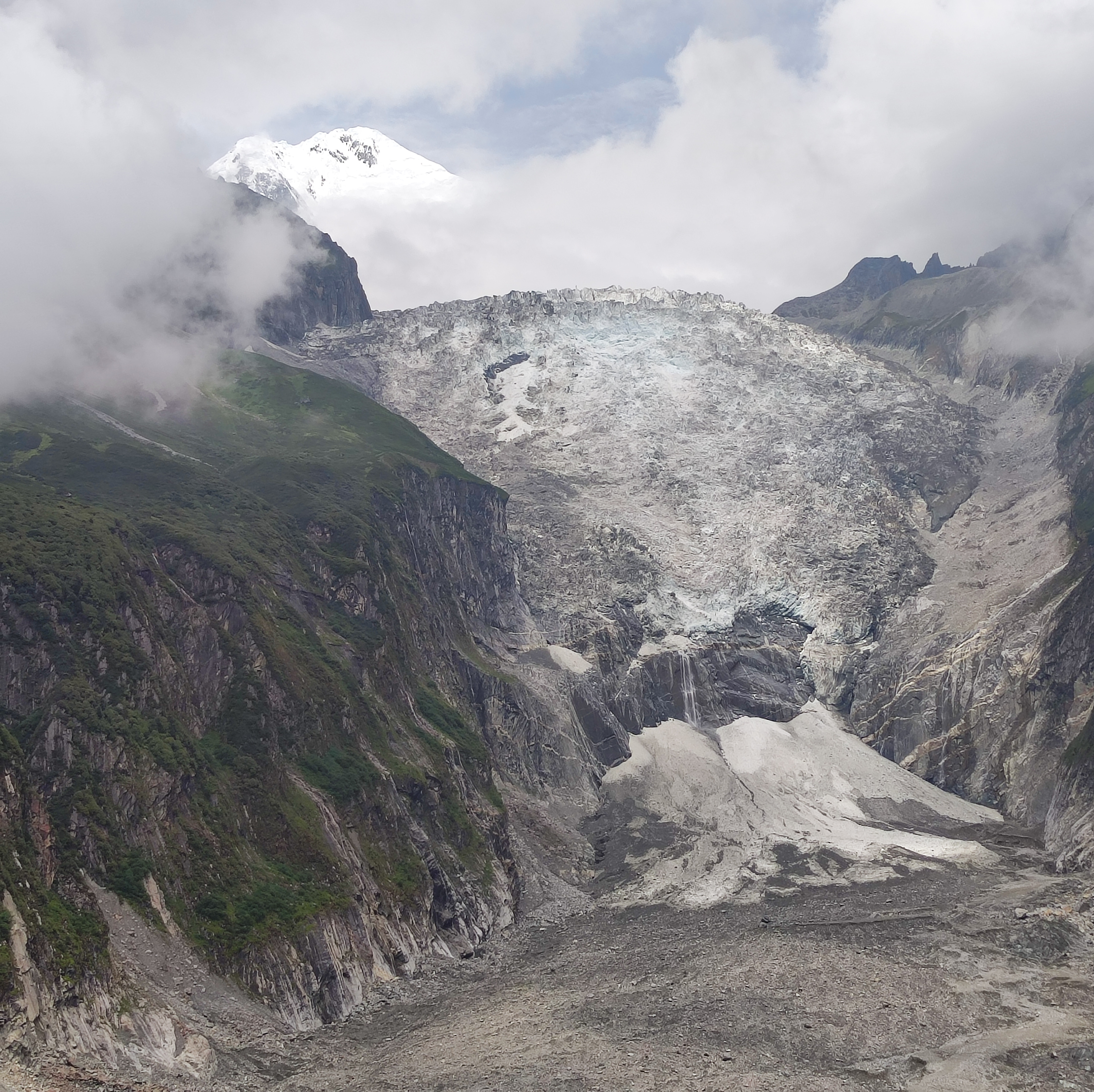
The Hailuogou Glacier

Mount Gongga is known for its rich and diverse ecosystems due to an elevation difference of more than 6,000 metres (20,000 ft) between the peak and the Dadu River valley nearby. The region is home to endangered animals such as the giant panda, the snow leopard, Thorold's deer, the dwarf musk deer, the black musk deer, the Asian golden cat, and the Chinese monal. A 1986 survey found around 2,500 vascular plant species (185 families, 869 genera), including a large number of endemic species.

Mount Gongga displays the following altitudinal zonation:

- Evergreen broadleaf forests (1,100–2,200 m on the eastern slopes): Lithocarpus cleistocarpus is the most common species, while Quercus engleriana, Cinnamomum longepaniculatum, and Phoebe chinensis grow in smaller patches.
- Montane mixed coniferous forests (2,200–2,500 m E. slopes): Pinus yunnanensis and Keteleeria evelyniana, mixed with broadleaf forests.
- Subalpine coniferous forests (2,500–3,600 m E. slopes, 2,800–4,000 m W. slopes): dominated by spruces and firs, such as Picea likiangensis and Abies squamata. Pinus densata grows in sunny spots on the western slopes of the mountain.
- Alpine meadows and shrubs (3,600–4,600 m E. slopes, 4,000–4,800 m W. slopes): primarily Rhododendron (about 50% of the species are endemic to the region) and Carex.
- Alpine screes (4,600–4,900 m E. slopes, 4,800–5,100 m W. slopes)
- Nival zone (above 4,900 m E. slopes, above 5,100 m W. slopes)

Mount Gongga has been a National Nature Reserve since 1997.

== Mountaineering history ==
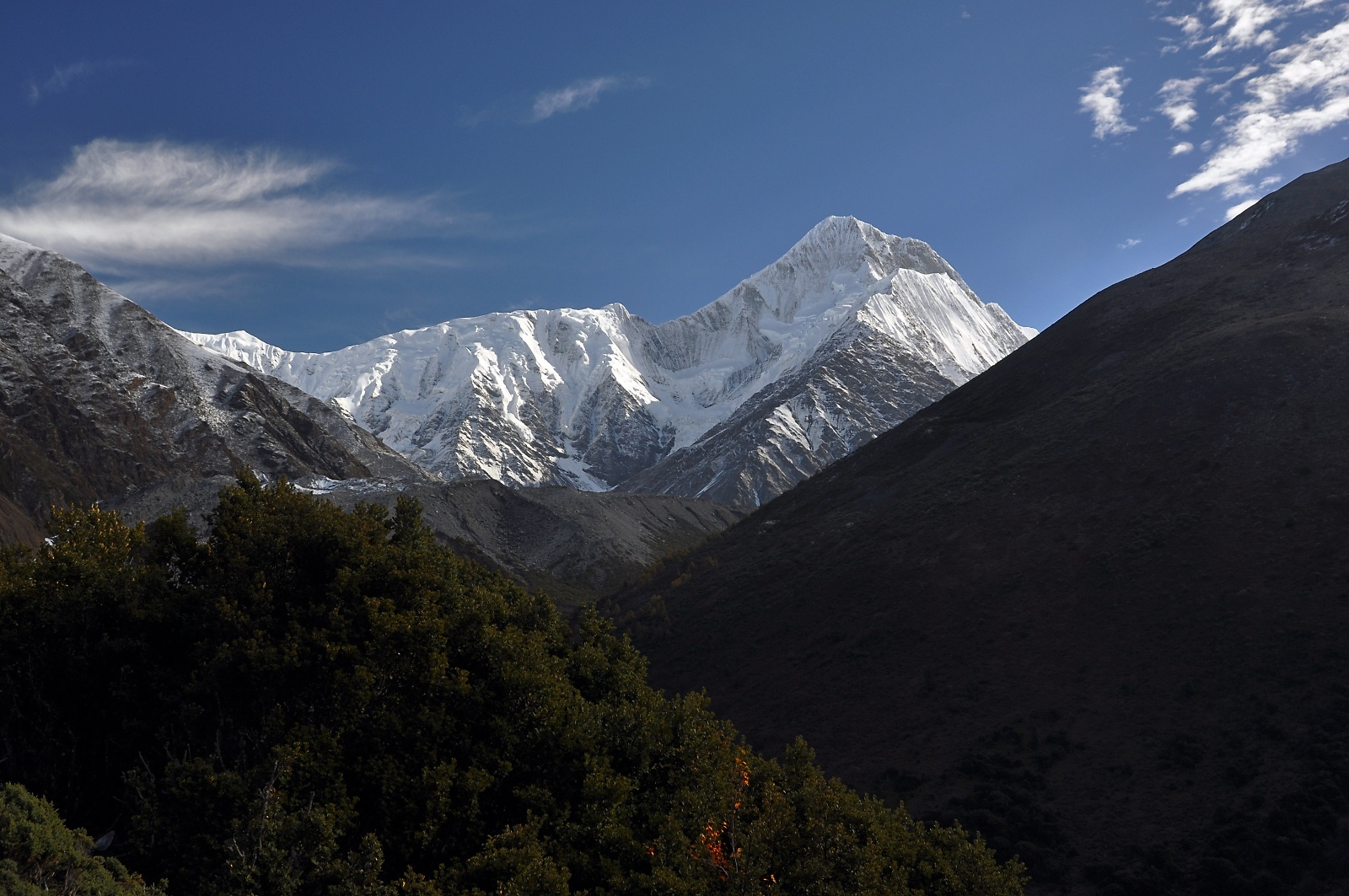
Northwest Ridge, the standard route of ascent

The first western explorers in this region heard reports of an extremely high mountain and sought it out. An early remote measurement of the mountain, then called Bokunka, was first performed by the Inner Asian expedition of the Hungarian count Béla Széchenyi between 1877 and 1880. That survey put the altitude of the peak at 7,600 metres (24,900 ft).

Forty-five years later, the mountain, this time called Gang ka, was sketched by China Inland Mission missionary James Huston Edgar from a distance.

In 1929 the explorer Joseph Rock, in an attempt to measure the mountain's altitude, miscalculated its height as 30,250 ft (9,220 m) and cabled the National Geographic Society to announce Minya Konka as the highest mountain in the world. This measurement was immediately viewed with suspicion, and the Society's decision to check Rock's calculations before publication was well-founded. Following discussions with the Society, Rock reduced his claim to 7,803 m (25,600 ft) in his formal publication.

In 1930 Swiss geographer Eduard Imhof led an expedition that measured the altitude of the mountain to be 7,590 m (24,900 ft). A richly illustrated large-format book about the expedition was eventually published by Imhof, Die Großen Kalten Berge von Szetchuan (Orell Fussli Verlag, Zurich, 1974). The book includes many color paintings by Imhof, including images of the Tibetan monastery at the foot of the sacred mountain. The monastery was almost completely destroyed during the Cultural Revolution, around 1972–74.

A properly equipped American team composed of Terris Moore, Richard Burdsall, Arthur B. Emmons, and Jack T. Young returned to the mountain in 1932 and conducted an accurate survey of the peak and its environs. Their summit altitude measurement agreed with Imhof's figure of 7,590 m (24,900 ft). Moore and Burdsall succeeded in climbing to the summit by starting on the west side of the mountain and climbing the Northwest Ridge. This was a remarkable achievement at the time, considering the height of the mountain, its remoteness, and the small size of the group. In addition, this peak was the highest summit reached by Americans until 1958 (though Americans had by that time climbed to higher non-summit points). The book written by the expedition members, Men Against The Clouds, remains a mountaineering classic.

In May 1957 a Chinese mountaineering team climbed Minya Konka via the Northwest Ridge route established by Moore and Burdsall. Six people reached the summit with limited climbing experience and primitive equipment, although four climbers died in the effort.

For political reasons, this region of China was made inaccessible to foreign climbers after the 1930s. In 1980 the region was again opened to foreign expeditions. American Lance Owens was the first foreigner to receive permission from the People's Republic of China to lead a mountaineering expedition in China and Tibet, allowing him to climb Gongga Shan (Minya Konka) in 1980. This expedition opened the modern era of American climbing in China. Sponsored by the American Alpine Club, the expedition attempted the still unclimbed and extremely technical west face of Minya Konka. Members of the expedition included Louis Reichardt, Andrew Harvard, Gary Bocarde, Jed Williamson, and Henry Barber.

In October 2017, Pavel Kořínek, a Czech national, reached the top of Gongga Shan, marking the first time since 2002 that the mountain had been successfully climbed. In an earlier attempt in 2016, the team had to retreat due to weather conditions.

Two Chinese mountaineers reportedly reached the summit in October 2018. In October 2024, 3 Chinese climbers, including one from the 2018 team, reached the summit via the north face-northeast ridge route.

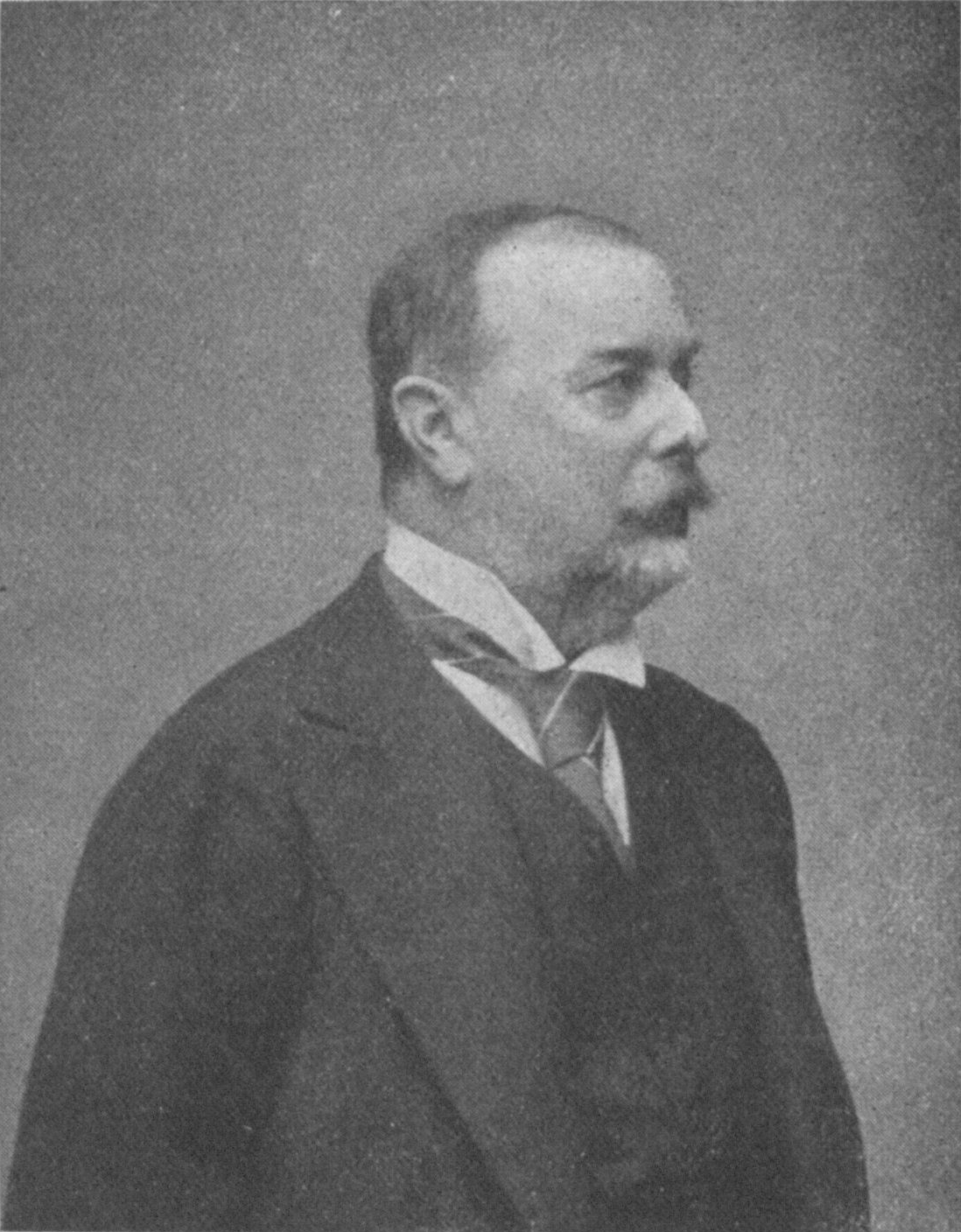
Graf Béla Széchenyi (Österreichs Illustrierter Zeitung, 1900)

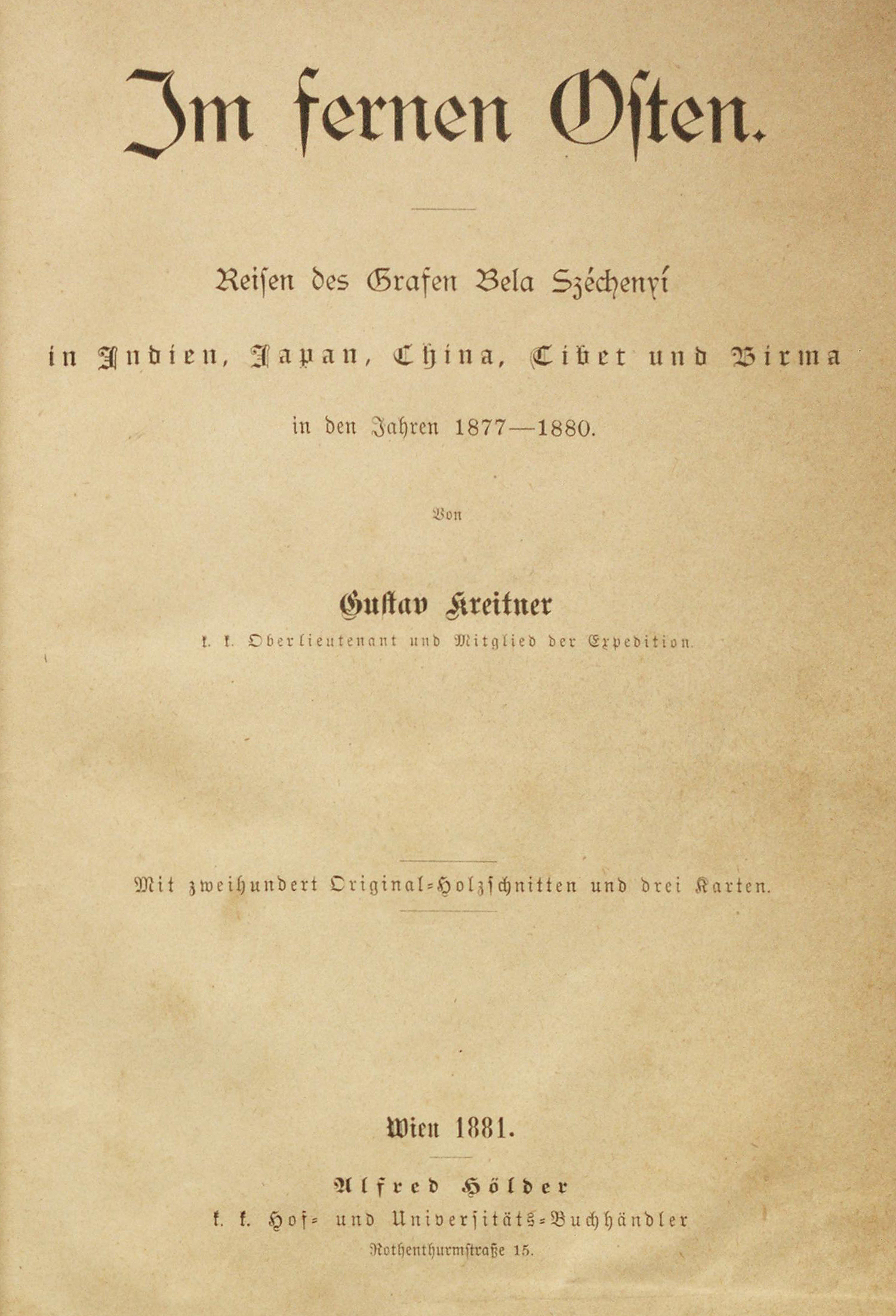
Title page of an expedition report from a member of Graf Béla Széchenyi's expedition

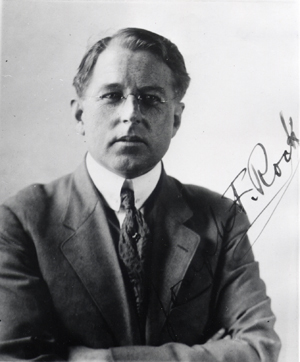
Joseph Rock

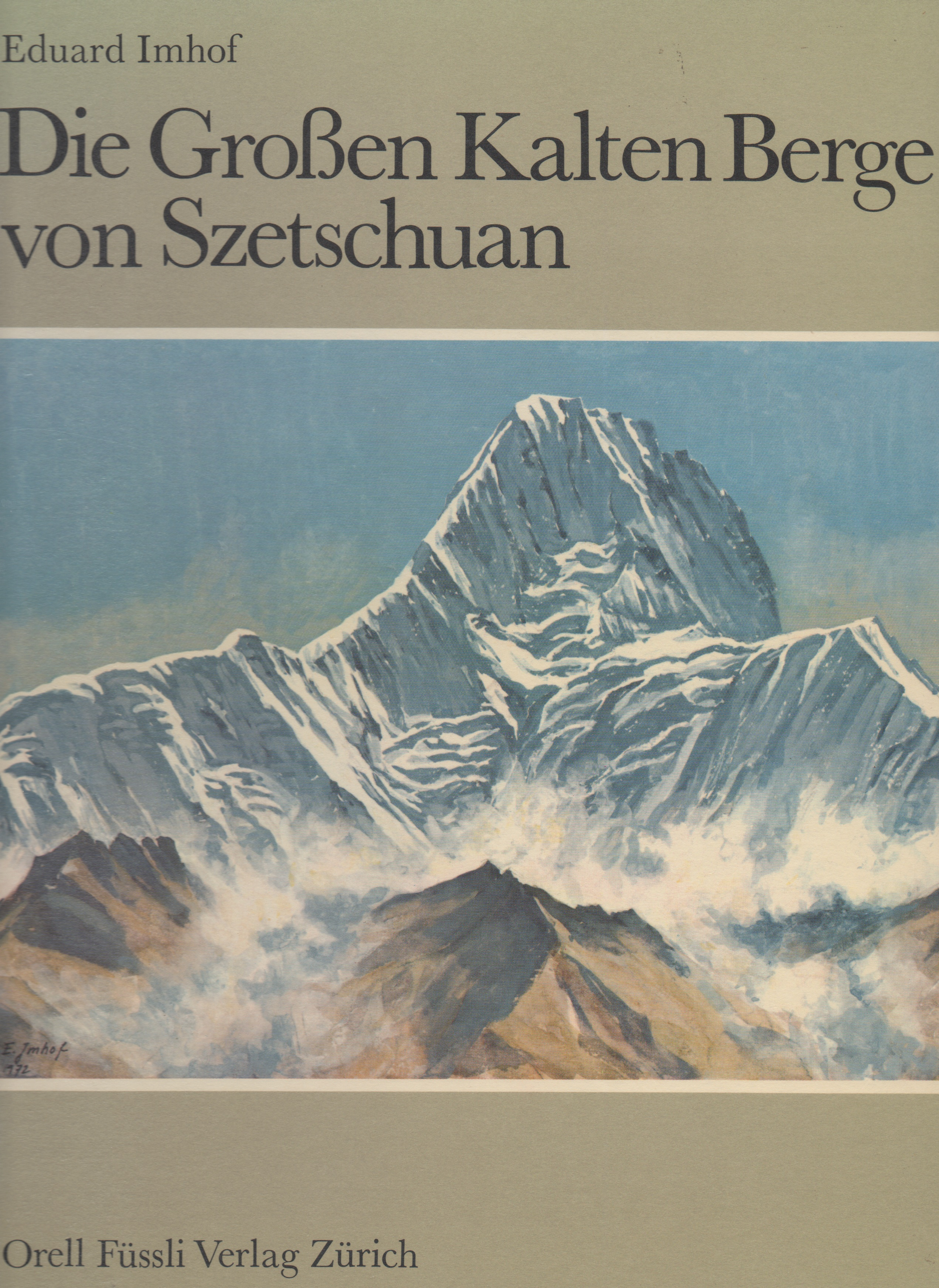
Eduard Imhof, Die Großen Kalten Berge von Szetschuan.

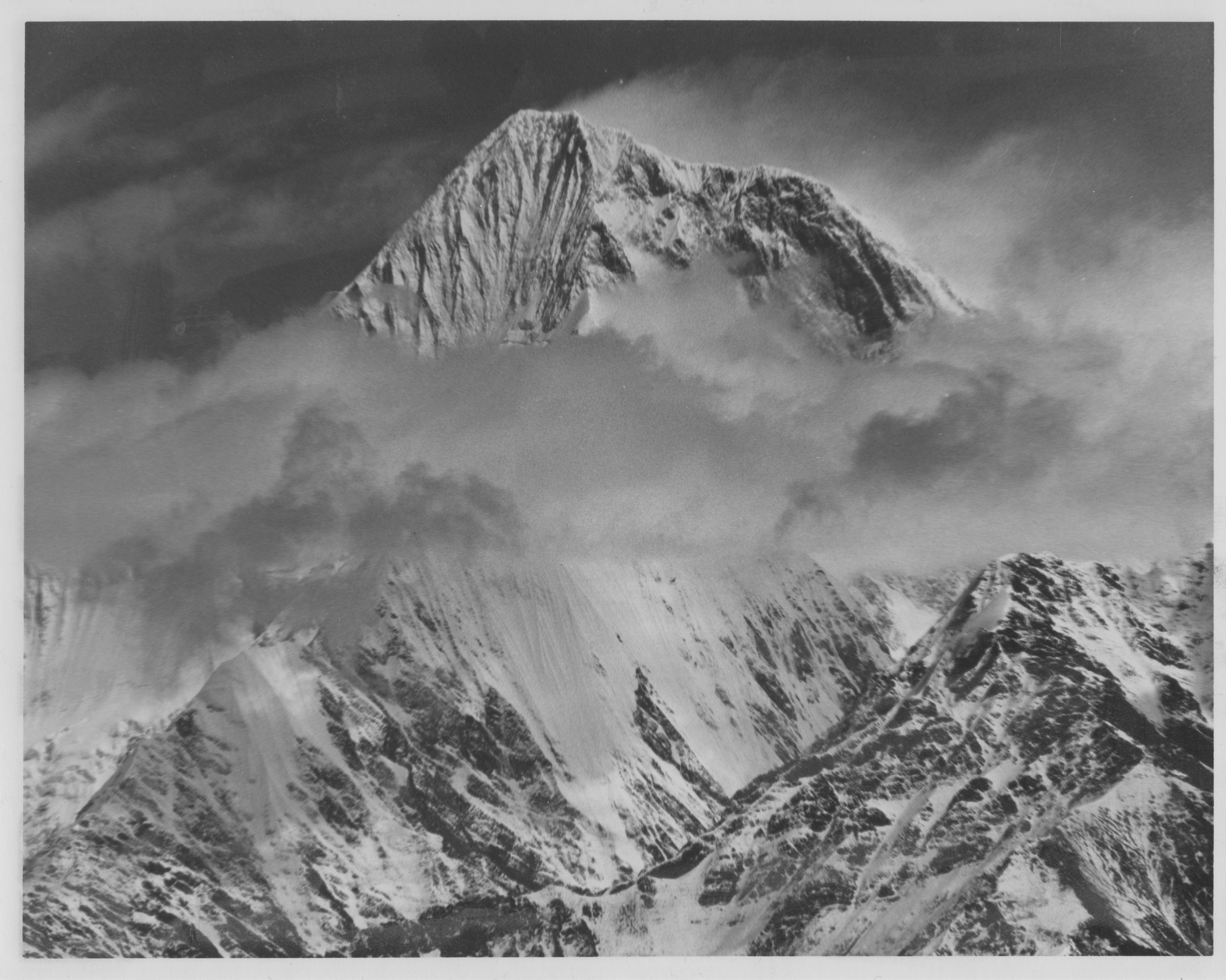
Minya Konka, photographed from the west. Photograph taken during the 1980 American expedition.

== Deaths on the mountain ==
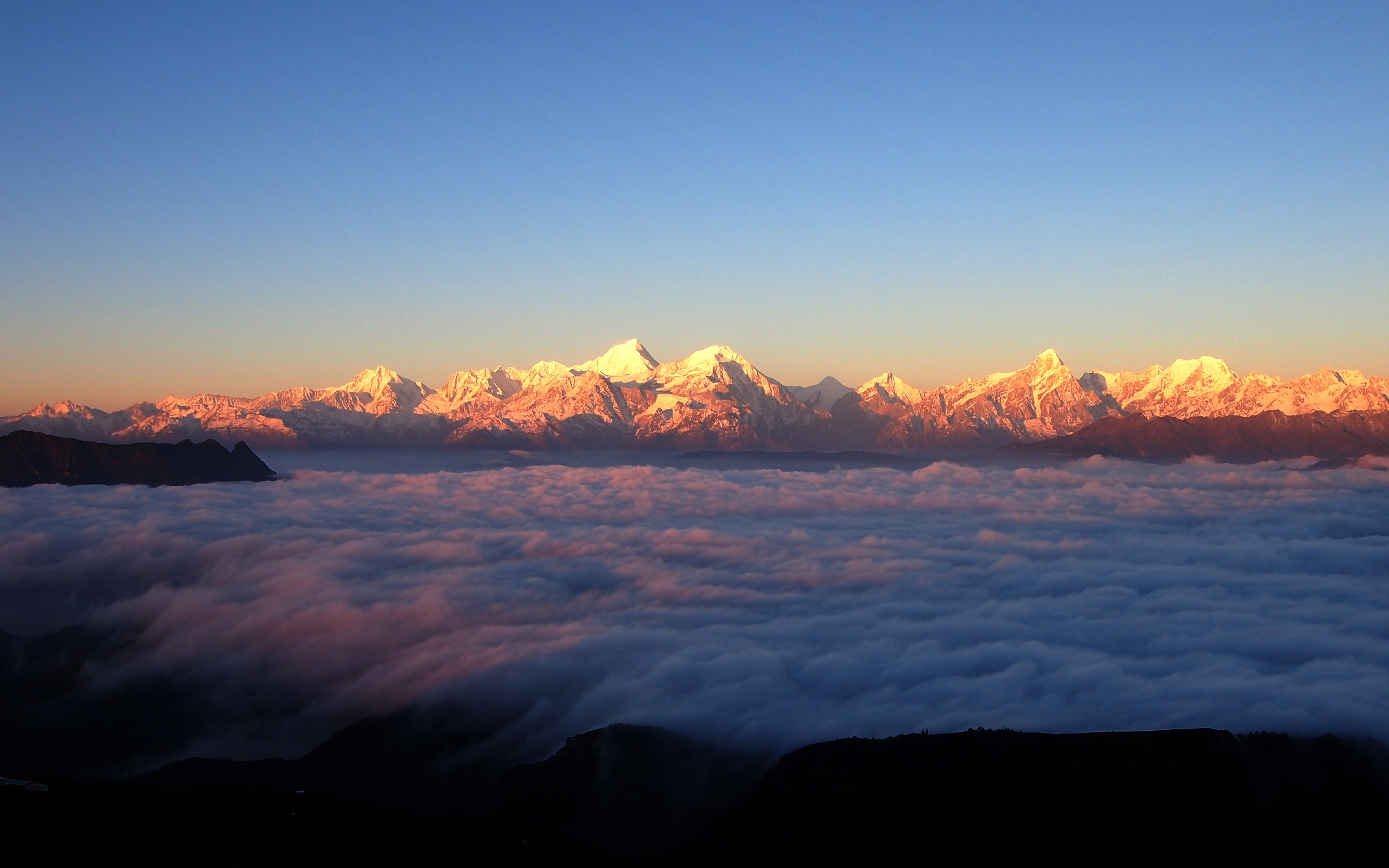
Mount Gongga and nearby peaks seen from Niubei Mountain

A large number of mountaineering deaths have occurred on Gongga Shan, which has earned a reputation as a difficult and dangerous mountain. While the first ascent route up the Northwest Ridge appears technically straightforward, it is plagued by avalanches due to the mountain's highly unpredictable weather. During the 1957 Chinese ascent of the peak, one climber died in an avalanche and three others died after falling in the midst of a sudden blizzard. In 1980 an American climber died in an avalanche on the Northwest Ridge route. In an unsuccessful 1981 attempt on the peak, eight Japanese climbers died in a fall. As of 1999, more climbers had died trying to climb the mountain than had reached the summit.

As of 2003, the mountain had been successfully climbed only eight times. In total, 22 climbers had reached the summit and 16 climbers had died in the effort. (These statistics may not take into account the four Chinese climbers killed in the 1957 expedition.)

The Himalayan Index lists five ascents of Gongga Shan between 1982 and 2002, and about seven unsuccessful attempts. There have been several attempts in years since then, which are unlisted in this index.

Local media summarized the climbing history of Gongga Shan (Minya Konka) as follows:

"Under the long-term action of the glaciers, the main peak developed into a cone-shaped, high-angle peak, with surrounding cliffs at 60° to 70°. Coupled with the bad weather in the region, it is difficult to conquer. The summit is much more difficult than Everest. According to incomplete statistics, as of September 2017, a total of 32 people had successfully reached the summit and 21 people were killed during attempts to climb the peak. According to the Sichuan Mountaineering Association, the death rate of Gongga Shan is much higher than Everest and all the 13 other peaks over 8000 meters, making it the peak with the highest mountain death rate in the world...."

== Side peaks ==
While the main summit can only be taken on by professional mountaineers, multiple side peaks are destination of commercial climbing trips, such as:

1. Zhongshan Peak (中山峰), 6,886 m
2. Mount Jinyin (金银山), 6,410 m
3. Nama Peak (那玛峰), 5,588 m
