= Xiaoxiang Range =

Mountain range in Sichuan, China

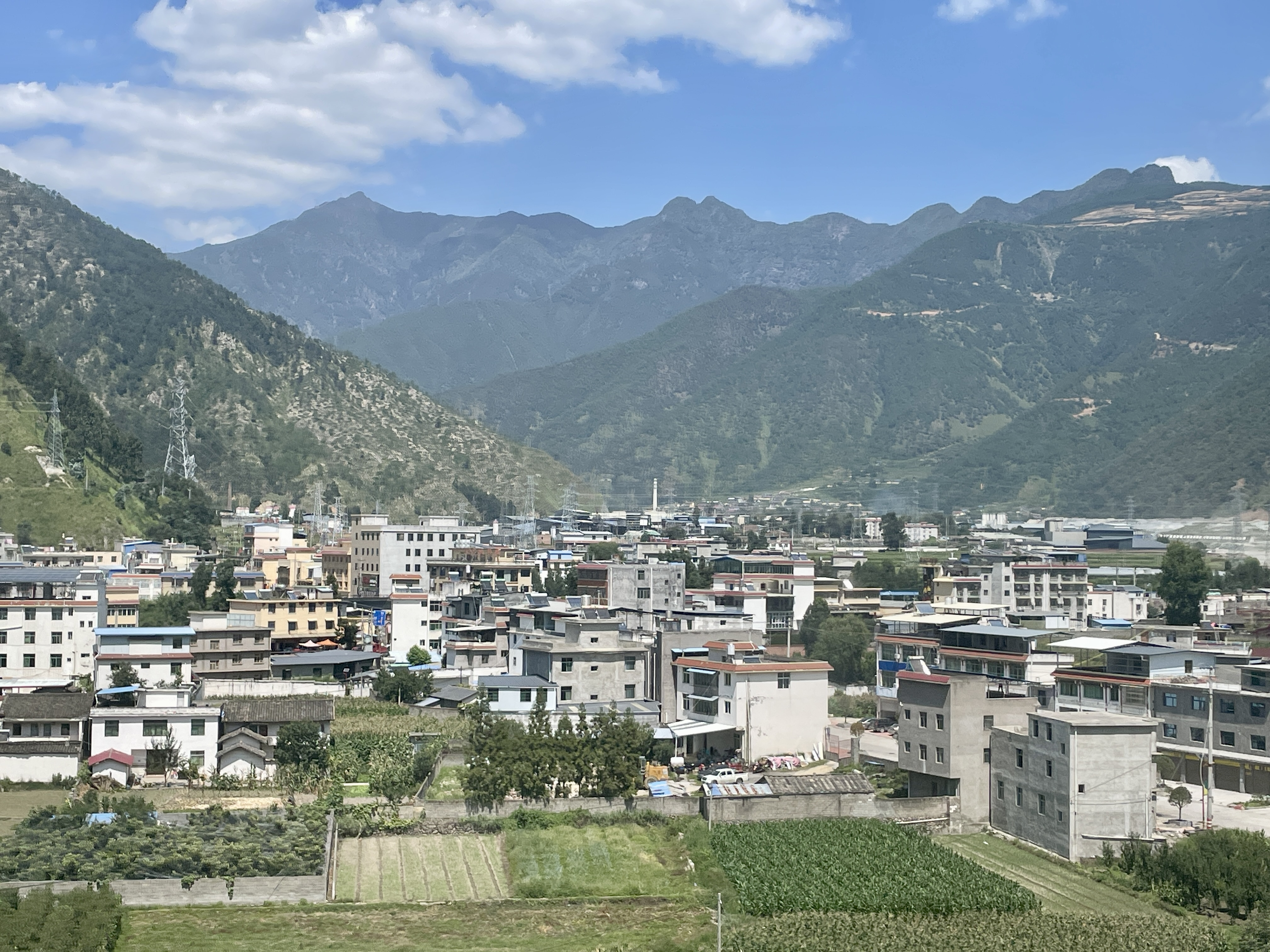
- Xiaoxiang Range in Xide County

Highest point
- Peak: Huatou Point
- Elevation: 4,791 m (15,719 ft)
- Coordinates: 28°43′45″N 102°22′46″E

Naming
- Native name: 小相岭 (Chinese)

Geography
- Country: China
- Prefecture / Province: Liangshan and Ya'an Prefectures, Sichuan

The Xiaoxiang Range (Chinese: 小相岭; pinyin: Xiǎoxiāng Líng; Yi: ꋓꃱꆼꏦ, romanized: Zzip Vo Liex Jie) is a mountain range in Sichuan Province, China. It is part of a complicated system of mountains in south-central Sichuan, and runs in the general north-south direction within Liangshan Yi Autonomous Prefecture and the adjacent parts of Ya'an prefecture-level city.

== Geography ==
The Xiaoxiang Range is situated in the rugged mountainous regions of Southwestern China where the Hengduan Mountains abut the Yungui Plateau. Despite lying between the Dadu and Yalong Rivers, the Xiaoxiang are not considered part of the Daxue Mountains. The Xiaoxiang, and all mountains further south bounded by the Jinsha (upper Yangtze) River, are more commonly considered a northern extension of the Yungui. The Xiaoxiang Range is separated from the Daxue Mountains by a narrow fault trench through which the G5 Expressway runs.

The Xiaoxiang are notable for their high ridge line, providing an unusually consistent straight range of peaks in the region. This is due to the Xiaoxiang's orogenic formation at the edge of the Yangtze Plate. The highest point of the range is Huatou Point (铧头尖) at 4,791 m (15,719 ft) above sea level. The Xiaoxiang Range was heavily glaciated during the last glacial period leaving many cirques and tarns dotted along the ridgeline today.

The Xiaoxiang Range is drained to west by the Anning River and its tributaries. The Anning separates the Xiaoxiang from the Miaoniu Mountains to the west. To the north and east, the Xiaoxiang is drained by tributaries of the Dadu River. Across the Dadu to the north lies the Daxiang Range. To the south and east are poorly defined mountainous regions with no range-like features with the exception of the Daliang Mountains further east.

== Human activity ==
The valleys surrounding the Xiaoxiang were originally inhabited by Yi peoples before Han Chinese settlement. The mountain summits have long been inaccessible and have been spared from the intensive agricultural uses that dominate many nearby mountainous areas. Thus, the lakes and forests along the Xiaoxiang ridgeline form a significant contiguous ecological habitat dominated by indigenous rhododendron species. This ecosystem has been classified by the WWF as part of the Qionglai-Minshan conifer forests and Yunnan Plateau subtropical evergreen forests ecoregions.

Administratively, the Xiaoxiang Range falls within Mianning County to the west, Yuexi County and Ganluo County to the east, and Shimian County to the north.

The Xiaoxiang Range rises above the primary route between Kunming, the capital of Yunnan, and Chengdu, the capital of Sichuan. The Chengdu–Kunming Railway passes directly east of the Xiaoxiang and the new Beijing-Kunming Expressway passes directly to the west. Areas at the south end of the Xiaoxiang Range are currently being developed as a tourist zone.

== See also ==
- List of ultras of Tibet, East Asia and neighbouring areas
