= Men Against the Clouds =

1935 book by Richard Lloyd Burdsall and Arthur B. Emmons

Men Against the Clouds:The Conquest of Minya Konka
- Author: Richard Lloyd Burdsall and Arthur B. Emmons
- Language: English
- Subject: Mountaineering
- Genre: non-fiction
- Published: 1935
- Publisher: The Bodley Head (1935); Mountaineers Books (1980)
- Publication place: United States
- Media type: Paperback
- Pages: 324
- ISBN: 978-0916890933

Men Against the Clouds:The Conquest of Minya Konka is a non-fiction mountaineering book by Richard Lloyd Burdsall and Arthur B. Emmons.

== Overview ==
This book tells the story of a four-person climbing party that made it to the top of the Minya Konka in 1932. The team consisted of Richard Lloyd Burdsall, Arthur B. Emmons, Terris Moore, and Jack T. Young. (an American of Chinese ancestry). In 1932, when Burdsall, and company climbed Minya Konka, it was the second-highest mountain climbed to date.

1980 saw the release of a revised edition by The Mountaineers (club).

A digital copy of the 1932 edition is available at the Internet Archive.

== Reception ==
Bhupesh Ashar writing for the Himalayan Journal, "A remarkable compilation of their unique expedition that describes their [four-person] travel through China, their exploration and the climb of Minya Konka at 24,900 ft—the first ascent of the mountain [Minya Konka]."
