= Baihe Nature Reserve =

Nature reserve in Sichuan, China

Coordinates: 34°14′N 104°07′E

Baihe Nature Reserve is located in northern Sichuan province in central China. It is home to some endangered species, including the golden snub-nosed monkey and the giant panda. The reserve, founded in 1963, covers an area of 163 sq. kilometers. It is near the Jiuzhaigou Valley and the scenic Huanglong Scenic and Historic Interest Area.
