= Daxue Mountains =

Mountain range in Sichuan, China

Daxue Range
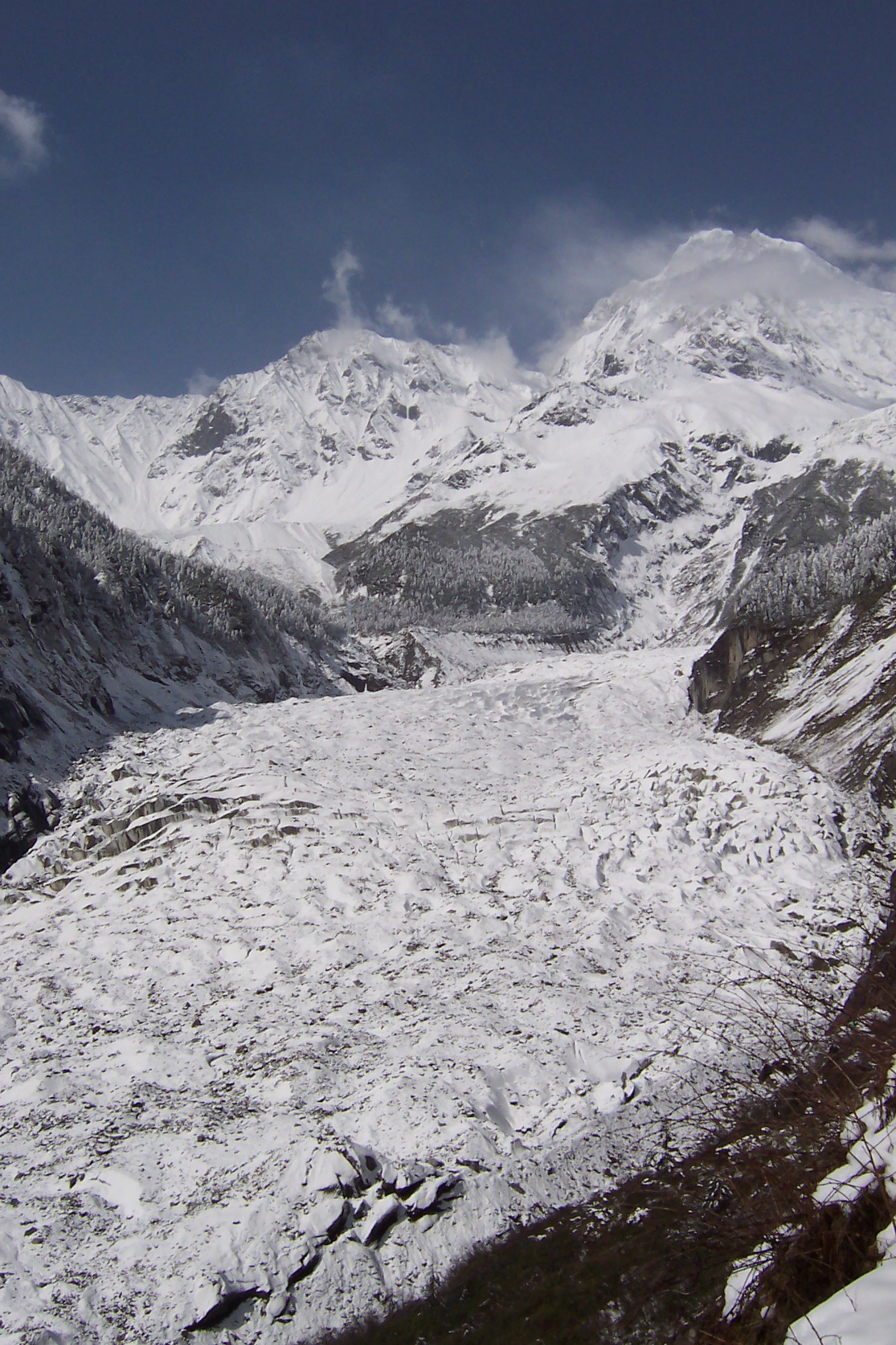
- Glaciers on the Gongga Shan

Highest point
- Peak: Gongga Shan (Minya Konka)
- Elevation: 7,556 m (24,790 ft)
- Coordinates: 29°35′48″N 101°52′43″E

Dimensions
- Length: 600 km (370 mi)

Naming
- Native name: 大雪山山脉 (Chinese)

Geography
- Location within Sichuan
- Country: China
- Province: Sichuan
- Parent range: Hengduan Mountains

The Daxue Range or Daxue Mountains (Chinese: 大雪山山脉, 大雪山; pinyin: Dàxuě Shān; Wade–Giles: Ta^{4}-hsüeh^{3} Shan^{1}; lit. 'Great Snow Mountains') are a great mountain range in the western part of Sichuan province in Southwest China. It is part of the Hengduan Mountains, a complicated system of mountain ranges of western Sichuan, which itself is adjacent to the eastern edge of the Tibetan Plateau.

== Geography ==
The Daxue Mountain Range runs for several hundred kilometers in a general north-south direction, mostly within Sichuan's Garzê Tibetan Autonomous Prefecture.

The Daxue Range marks a transitional zone between the arid Tibetan Plateau and the wetter Sichuan Basin. It separates the basins of the Yalong River (to the west) and the Dadu River (to the east). Both rivers flow in the general southern direction, and are tributaries of the Yangtze.

The tallest peak of the range, the Gongga Shan (Minya Konka), measures 7,556 meters in height. It is located in the southern part of the range.

To the east and south of the Gongga Shan, the Daxue Mountains are adjacent to the smaller Daxiangling and Xiaoxiangling ranges, which, however, are usually considered by cartographers as separate ranges.

== See also ==
- Hengduan Mountains
- Global 200
