= Daxiangling =

Mountain range in Sichuan, China

Coordinates: 29°30′N 102°30′E

Daxiangling (simplified Chinese: 大相岭; traditional Chinese: 大相嶺; pinyin: Dàxiānglǐng), or Daxiang Range is a fairly small mountain range in China's Sichuan Province. It runs in the general western and northwestern direction from the famous sacred Mount Emei, and is part of the western mountainous rim of the Sichuan Basin.

Administratively, the mountains are within the prefecture-level cities of Ya'an, Meishan, and Leshan.

The Daxiangling forms a divide between the valley of the Dadu River (which flows to the west, and then to the south, of the mountains) and that of its tributary, the Qingyi River (which is to the northeast of the Daxiangling).

The narrow valley of the Dadu separates the Daxiangling from the Xiaoxiangling Range to the south, and the great Daxue Mountains to the west.
