= Wulian Feng =

Mountain range in Yunnan, China

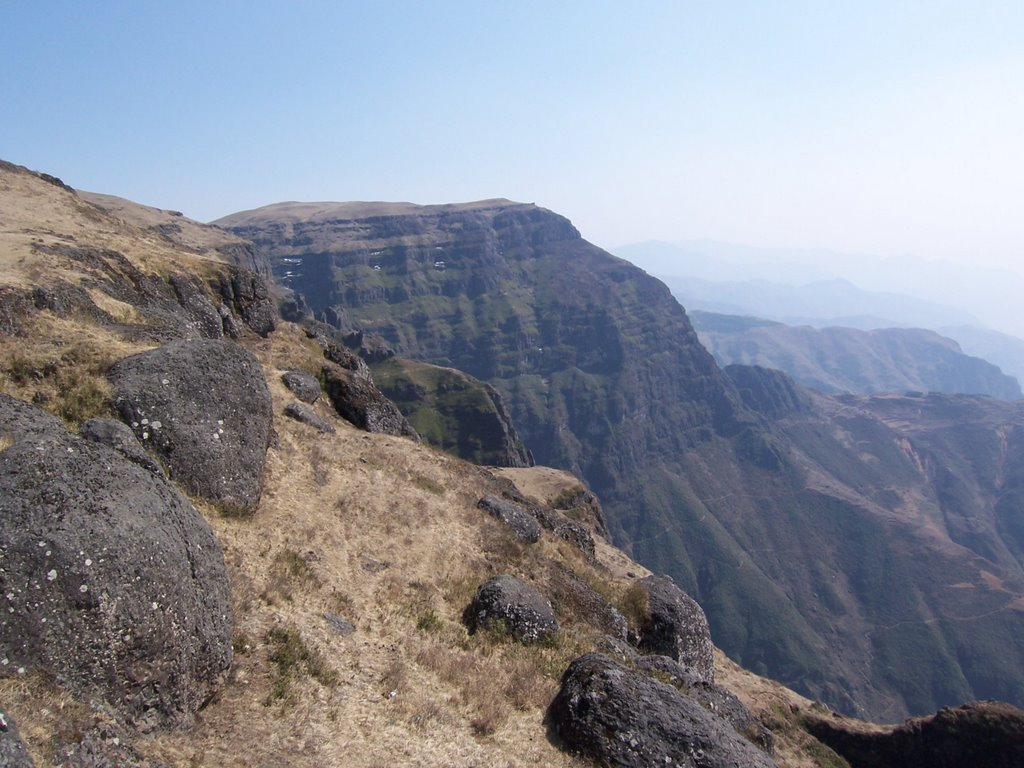
- Dashanbao summit

Highest point
- Peak: Dashanbao
- Elevation: 3,364 m (11,037 ft)
- Coordinates: 27°22′40″N 103°16′30″E

Naming
- Native name: 五莲峰 (Chinese)

Geography
- Country: China
- Prefecture / Province: Zhaotong, Yunnan
- Parent range: Yungui Plateau

The Wulian Feng (Chinese: 五莲峰; pinyin: Wǔlián fēng; lit. 'Five lotus peaks') are a mountain range in Yunnan, China, forming the northwest edge of the Yungui Plateau. The mountains are more of an escarpment than a true mountain range, towering above the right bank of the Jinsha River as it enters the Sichuan Basin and becomes the Yangtze. From the Jinsha River floor, the Wulian Feng rise over 2,500 m (8,200 ft) in less than 5 km (3.1 mi) forming impressive peak-like characteristics and thus leading to their name. They run entirely in Zhaotong Prefecture from the Jigongshan Grand Canyon of Ludian County in the southwest to Suijiang County in the northeast. The northern portion of the Wulian Feng exhibit more mountain-like characteristics as the Yungui Plateau is broken up here and valleys cut between the mountain peaks.

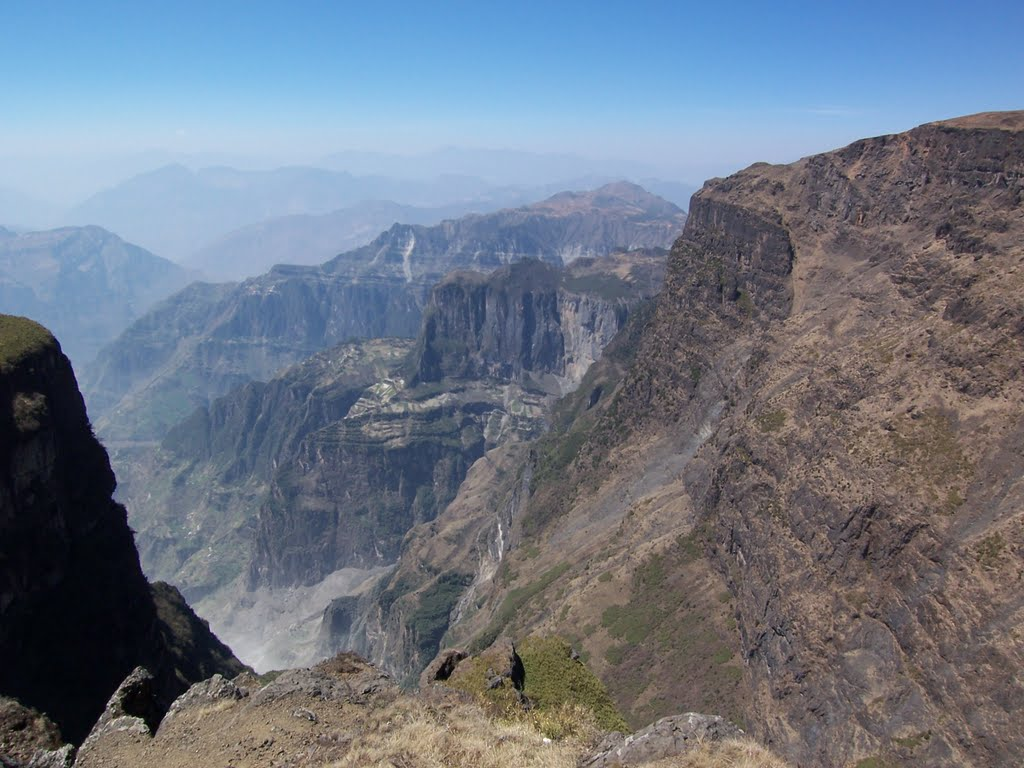
Jigongshan Grand Canyon escarpment at the western edge of the Wulian Feng

The highest point of the range is the 3,364 m (11,037 ft)-high summit of Dashanbao (Chinese: 大山包; pinyin: Dàshānbāo) in the south which rises dramatically 2,600 m (8,500 ft) from the west but rises only a mere 200 m (660 ft) from the east. Mount Yao, across the Niulan River to the southwest, is even higher at 4,040 m (13,250 ft) above sea level, but is not considered part of the Wulian Feng.

Dashanbao Nature Reserve, at the height of the Wulian Feng, is an important black-necked crane wintering site.
