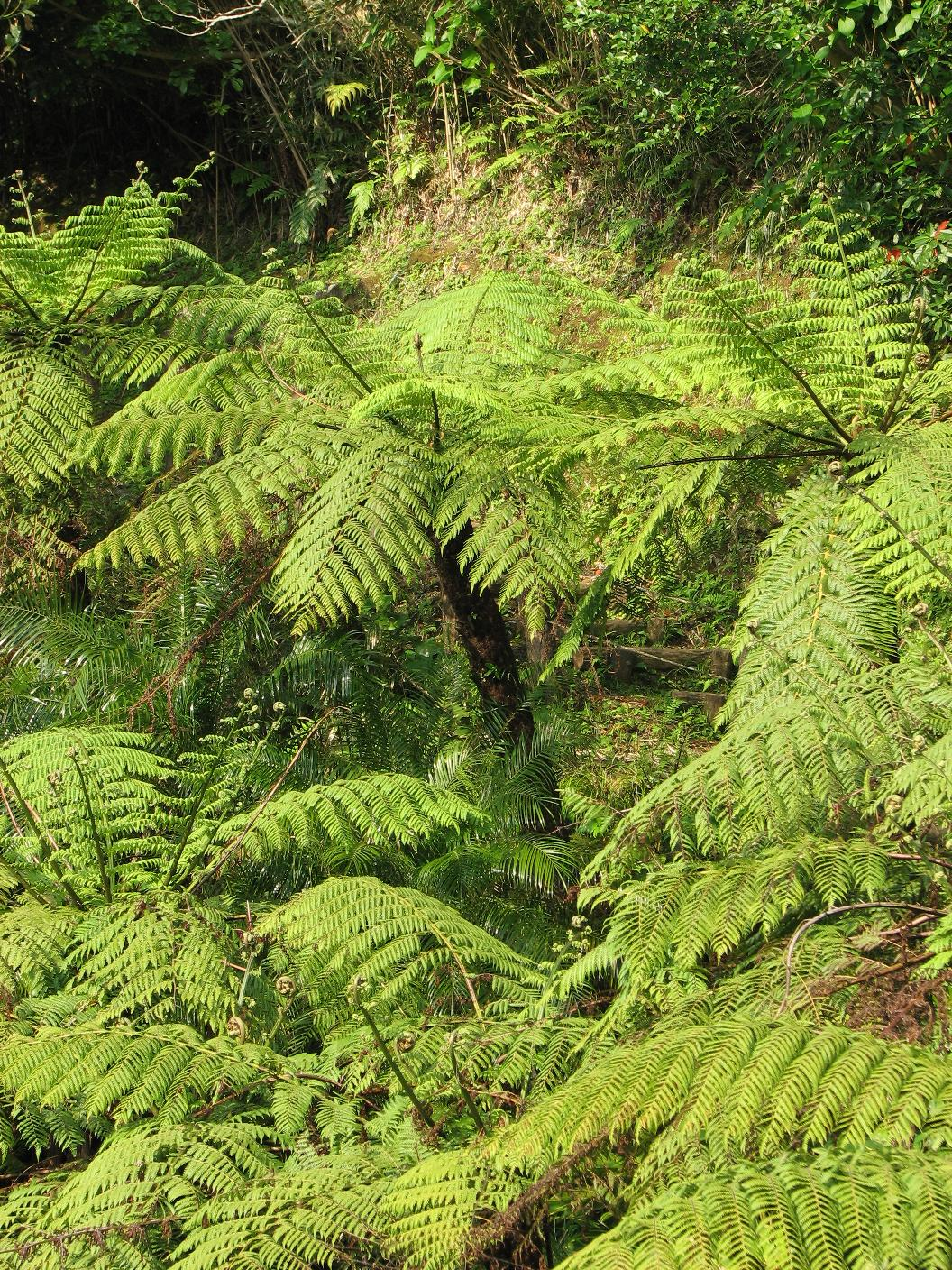

Scientific classification
- Kingdom: Plantae
- Clade: Tracheophytes
- Division: Polypodiophyta
- Class: Polypodiopsida
- Order: Cyatheales
- Family: Cyatheaceae
- Genus: Alsophila
- Species: A. spinulosa

Binomial name
- Alsophila spinulosa (Wall. ex Hook.) R.M.Tryon

Synonyms
- Alsophila boninsimensis (Christ ex Diels) Christ; Alsophila confucii Christ; Alsophila decipiens J.Scott ex Bedd.; Alsophila fauriei Christ; Alsophila taiwaniana Nakai; Amphicosmia decipiens (J.Scott ex Bedd.) Bedd.; Cyathea austrosinica Christ; Cyathea boninsimensis (Christ ex Diels) Copel.; Cyathea confucii (Christ) Copel.; Cyathea decipiens (J.Scott ex Bedd.) C.B.Clarke & Baker; Cyathea fauriei (Christ) Copel.; Cyathea spinulosa Wall.; Cyathea taiwaniana Nakai; Hemitelia beddomei C.B.Clarke; Hemitelia boninsimensis Christ ex Diels; Hemitelia decipiens (J.Scott ex Bedd.) J.Scott

= Alsophila spinulosa =

Species of fern

Alsophila spinulosa, also known as the flying spider-monkey tree fern, is a species of tree fern in the family Cyatheaceae.

== Description ==
The trunk of this species can grow to a height of 5 m or more. The stipes are persistent, spiny and purplish towards the base, and covered in brown shiny scales. Fronds are 1–3 m long and three-limbed. The sori, producing the spores, are large and round. Like many tree ferns, it features a "skirt" of dead leaves that do not drop off the crown and form a barrier for parasitic climbing plants.

== Distribution and habitat ==
A. spinulosa occurs in humus soils in shadowed forest locations, and is widely distributed across Asia including China, Nepal, India, Burma, Myanmar, and Japan.

== Use by humans ==
The stems are rich in starch and edible. Stem chips also see use as fern chips as a substrate for the cultivation of orchids.

== Genome ==
In May 2022, the sequenced genome of A. spinulosa, was published by Huang et al. and showed whole-genome duplication had occurred approximately 100 million years ago; since then, evidence of the sequencing suggests, the genome has remained stable. It was only the third time a fern's nuclear genome had been mapped, and the first instance of a fern with a genome of this size being sequenced.

== Gallery ==
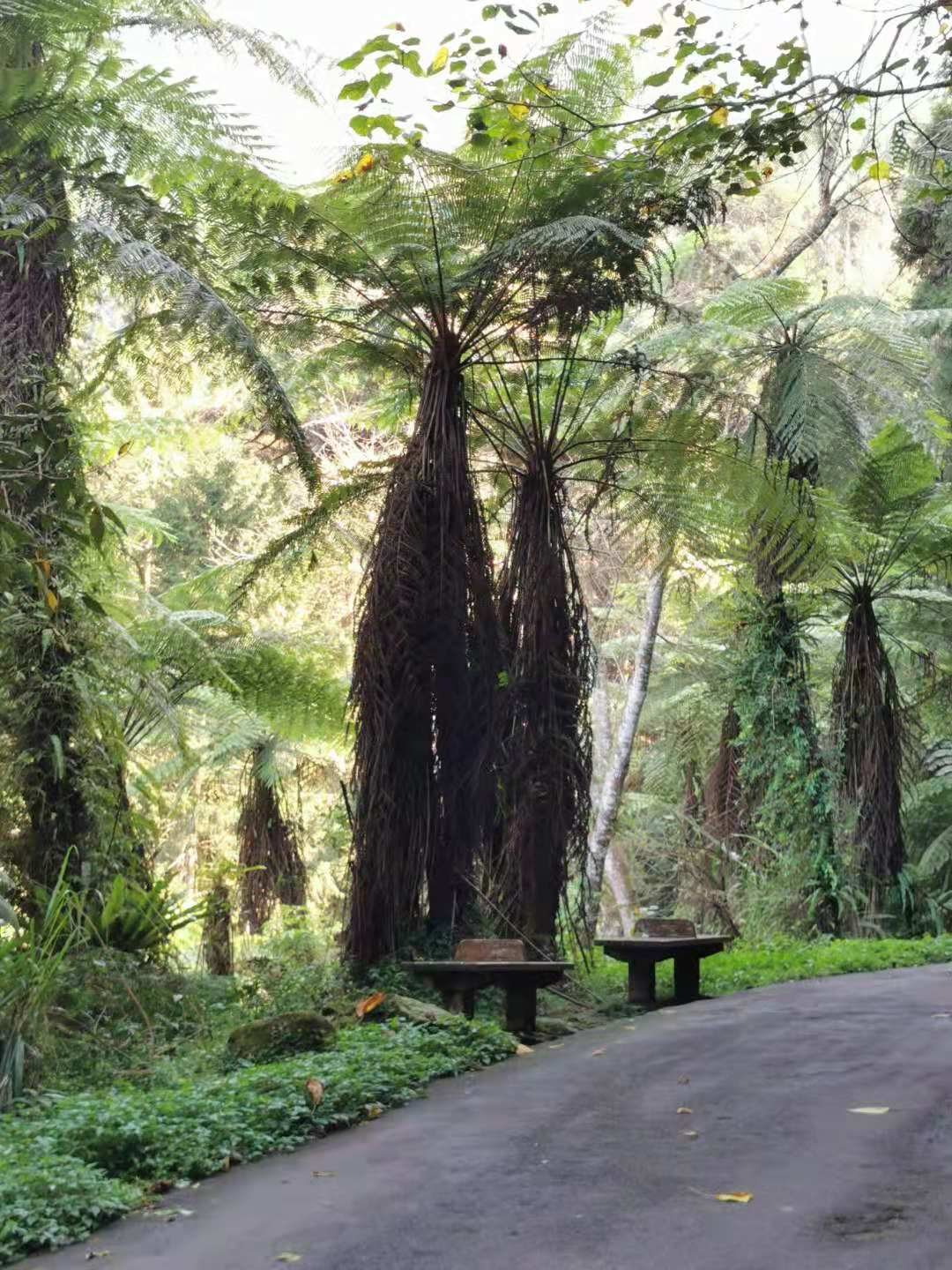

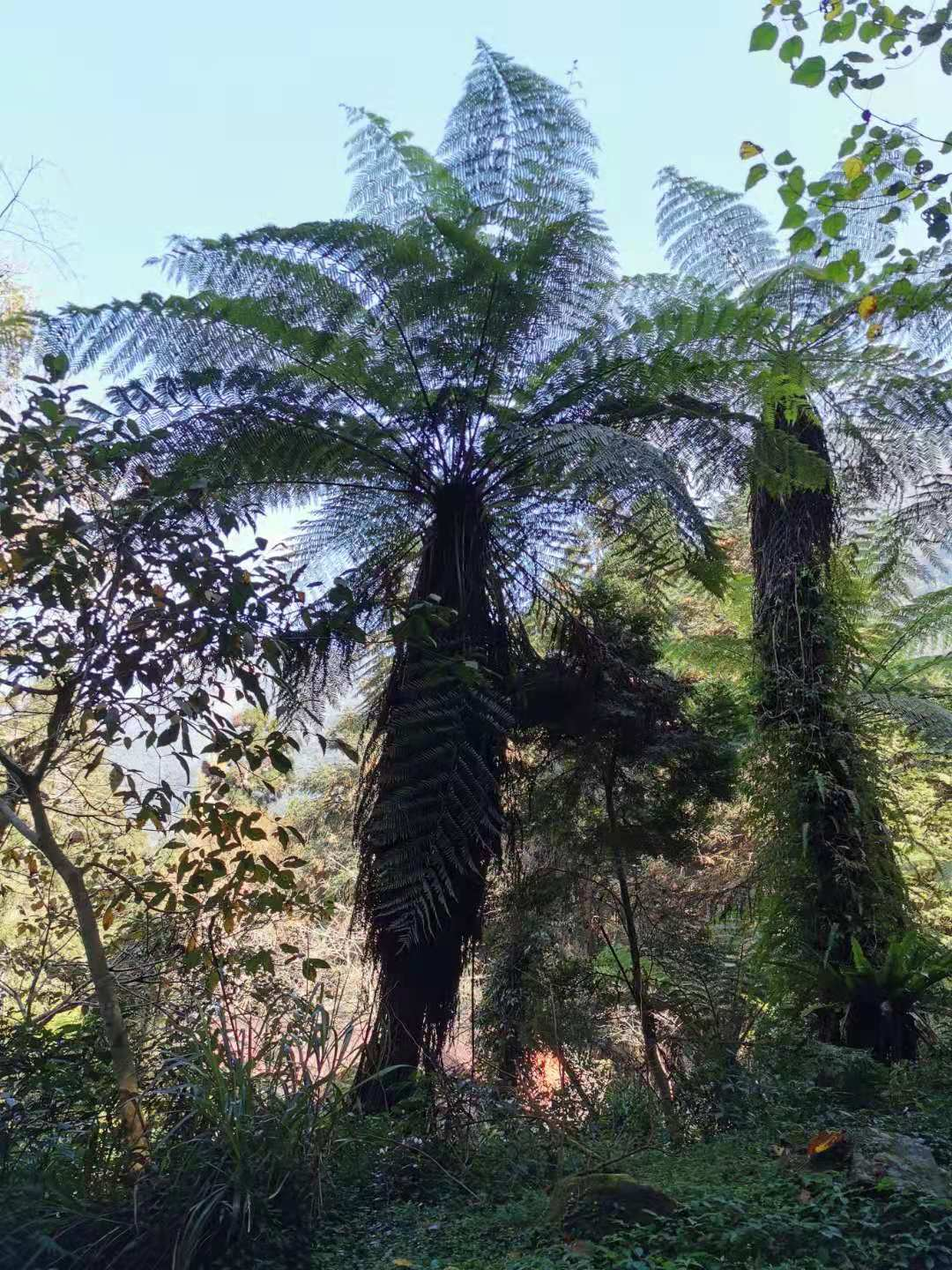

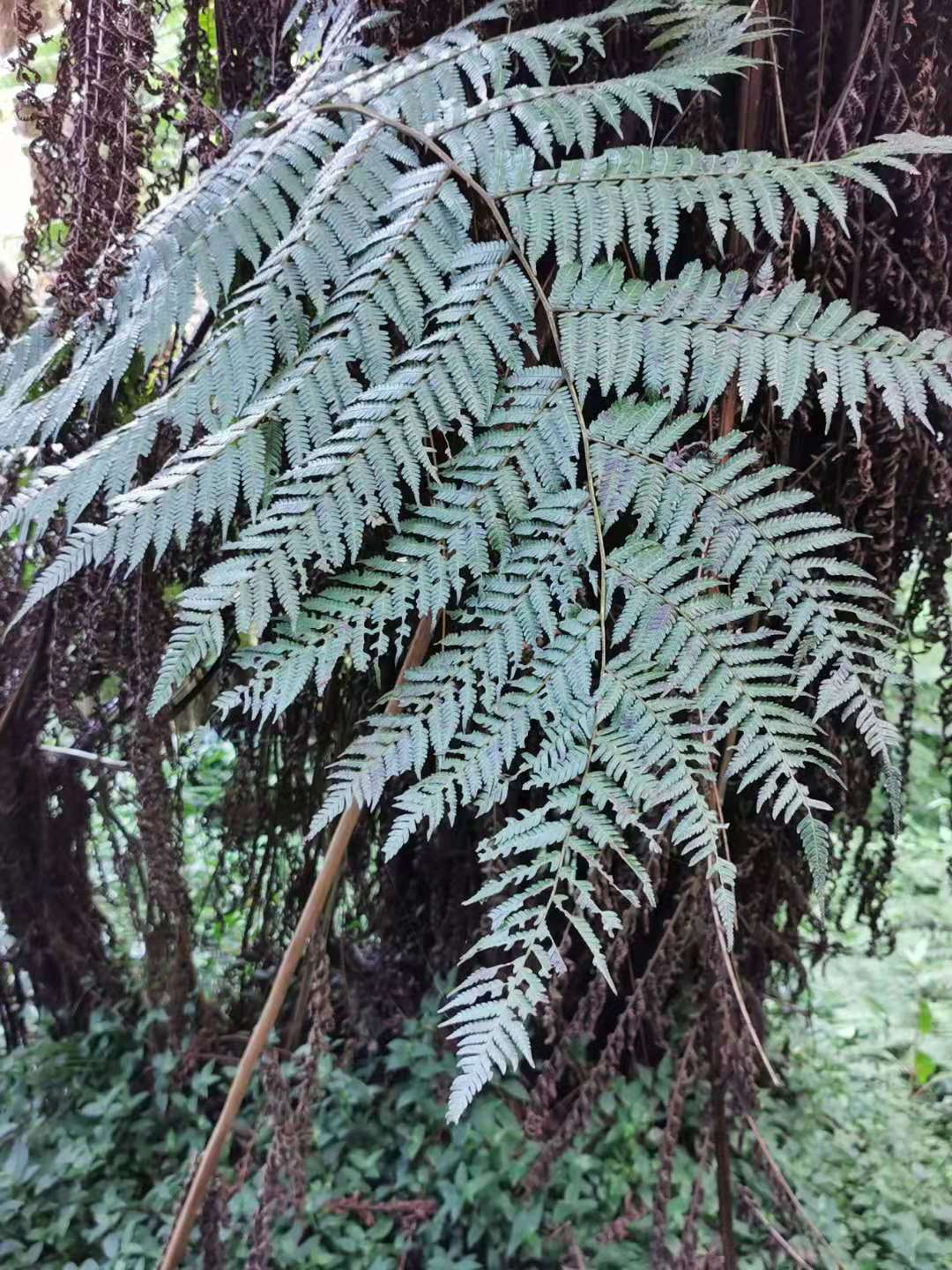

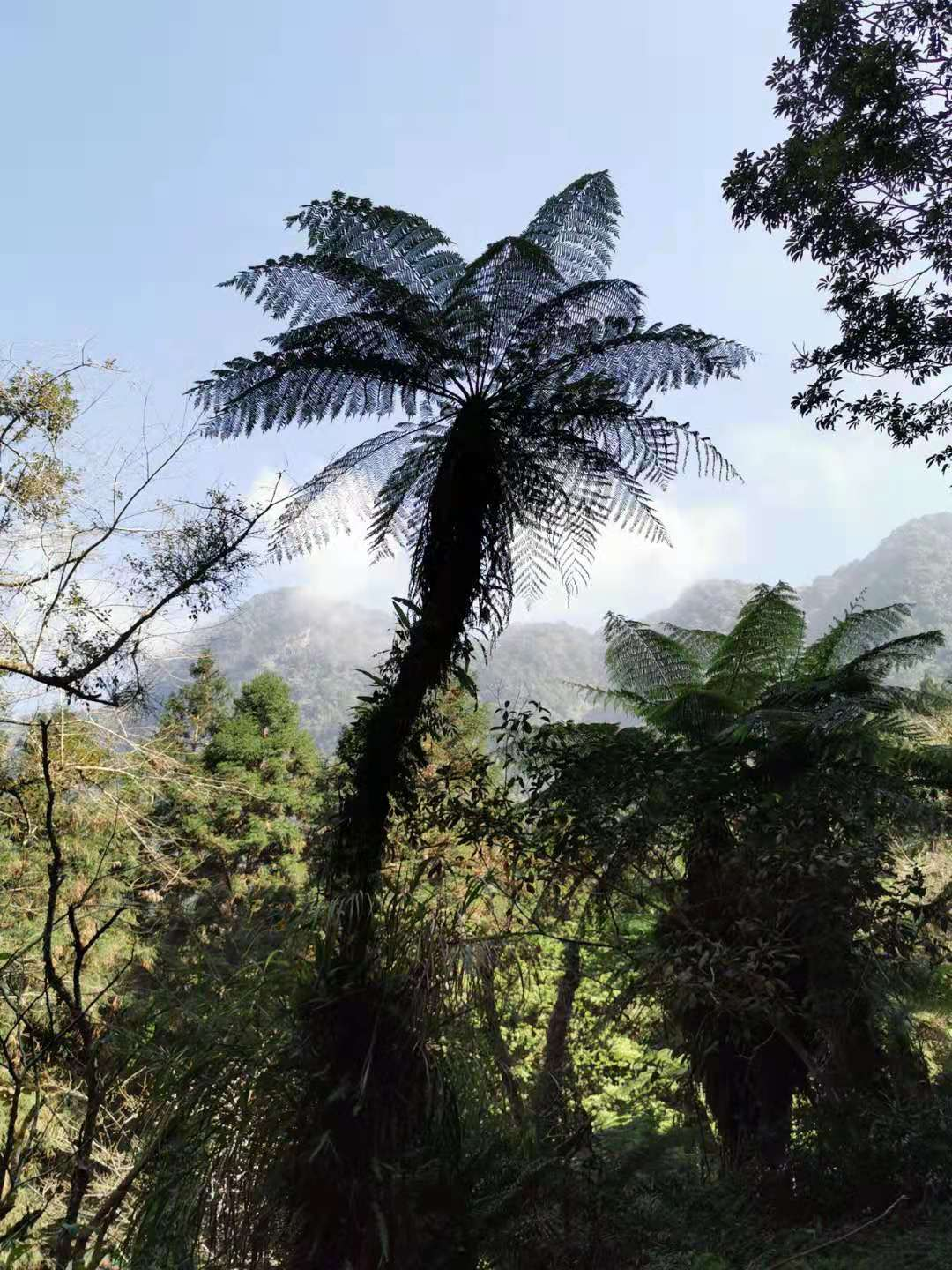
