= Yunnan Plateau subtropical evergreen forests =

Ecoregion in Yunnan Plateau, China

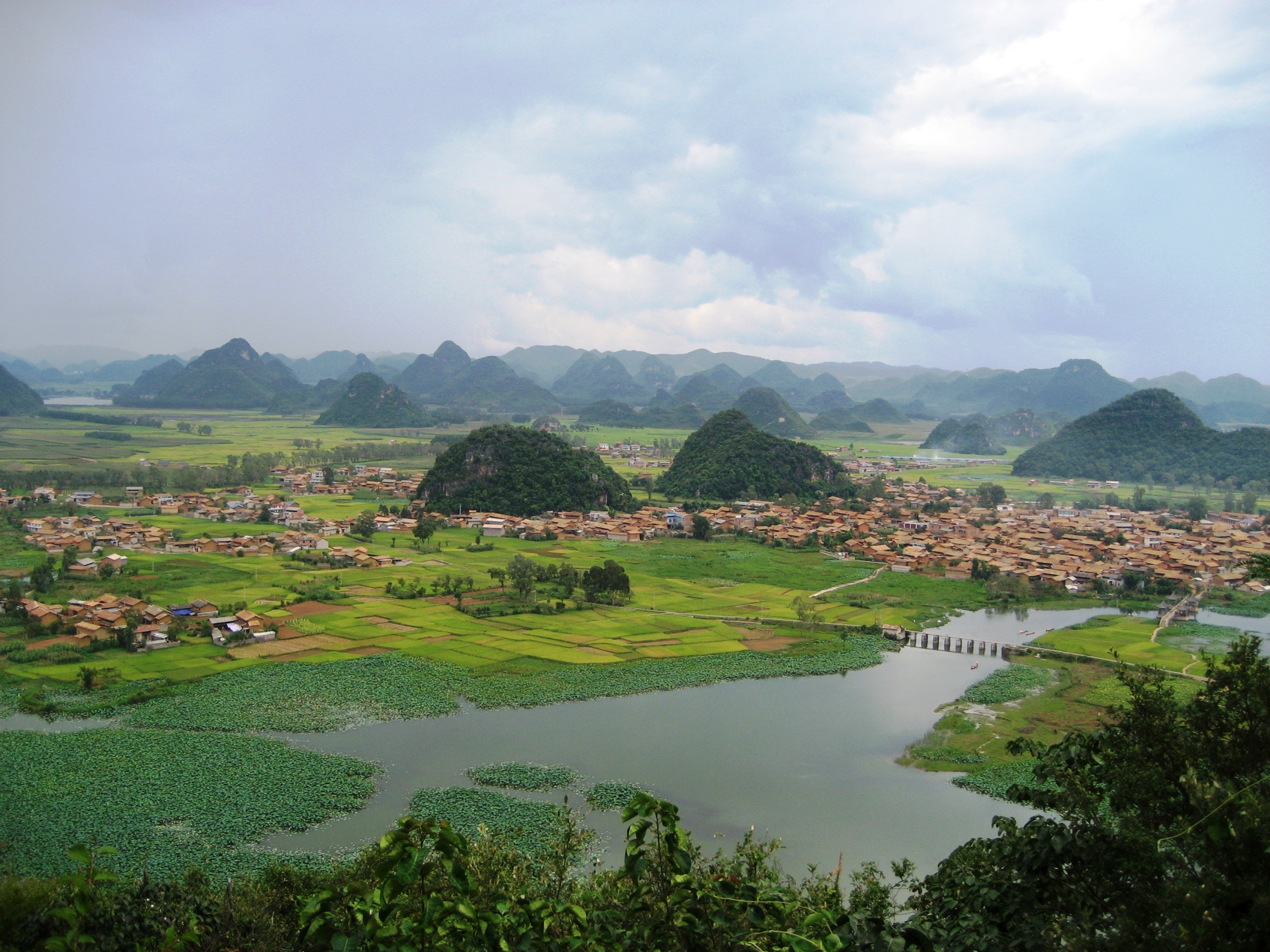
- Remnant subtropical evergreen forests covering karst hills in Qiubei County

- Location of ecoregion

Ecology
- Realm: Palearctic
- Biome: tropical and subtropical moist broadleaf forests
- Borders: List: Guizhou Plateau broadleaf and mixed forests; Hengduan Mountains subalpine conifer forests; Jian Nan subtropical evergreen forests; Northern Indochina subtropical forests; Nujiang Lancang Gorge alpine conifer and mixed forests; South China-Vietnam subtropical evergreen forests

Geography
- Area: 240,350 km^{2} (92,800 sq mi)
- Country: China
- Provinces: Guangxi; Guizhou; Sichuan; Yunnan

Conservation
- Conservation status: Critical / Endangered

The Yunnan Plateau subtropical evergreen forests is an endangered ecoregion in southwestern China. These forests once covered the western parts of the Yungui Plateau but have been significantly reduced and replaced with agricultural land uses. The Yunnan evergreen forests and the neighbouring Guizhou Plateau broadleaf and mixed forests are the only two ecoregions in the Palearctic realm to be classified as part of tropical and subtropical moist broadleaf forests biome.

== Description ==
Territory that was once covered by the Yunnan Plateau subtropical evergreen forests includes most of the western Yungui Plateau which makes up the eastern half of Yunnan as well as parts of southern Sichuan, western Guizhou, and northwestern Guangxi. The Yungui Plateau is relatively flatter here and human agricultural development has greatly reduced the extent of the Yunnan Plateau evergreen forests. In some areas of the ecoregion, rice production has reached altitudes of nearly 3,000 m (9,800 ft), the highest anywhere in the world.

== Climate ==
This region experiences a mild climate as the high altitude and low latitude negate many of the extreme effects of either climatic feature.

== Flora ==
Today, forest remnants are isolated along mountain ridges, karst hills, and steeper valleys where agriculture is not prevalent. Significant remaining tracts of the evergreen forests include Qinglongxia Scenic Area, the Cang Mountains, Mount Jizu, the Western Hills Forest Reserve, and the Ailao Mountain Nature Reserve. In other places in the ecoregion, the evergreen forests have been replaced by strands of dominating Yunnan pine. It is unclear to what extent Yunnan pine coexisted in the Yunnan Plateau subtropical evergreen forests prior to agricultural development in the region.

== Fauna ==
Animal species that can be found in the Yunnan Plateau subtropical evergreen forests include black gibbons, bamboo rats, and Asiatic black bears. A notable extirpated species is the tiger.
