= Yunnan–Guizhou Plateau =

Highland region located in southwest China

- Yungui Plateau
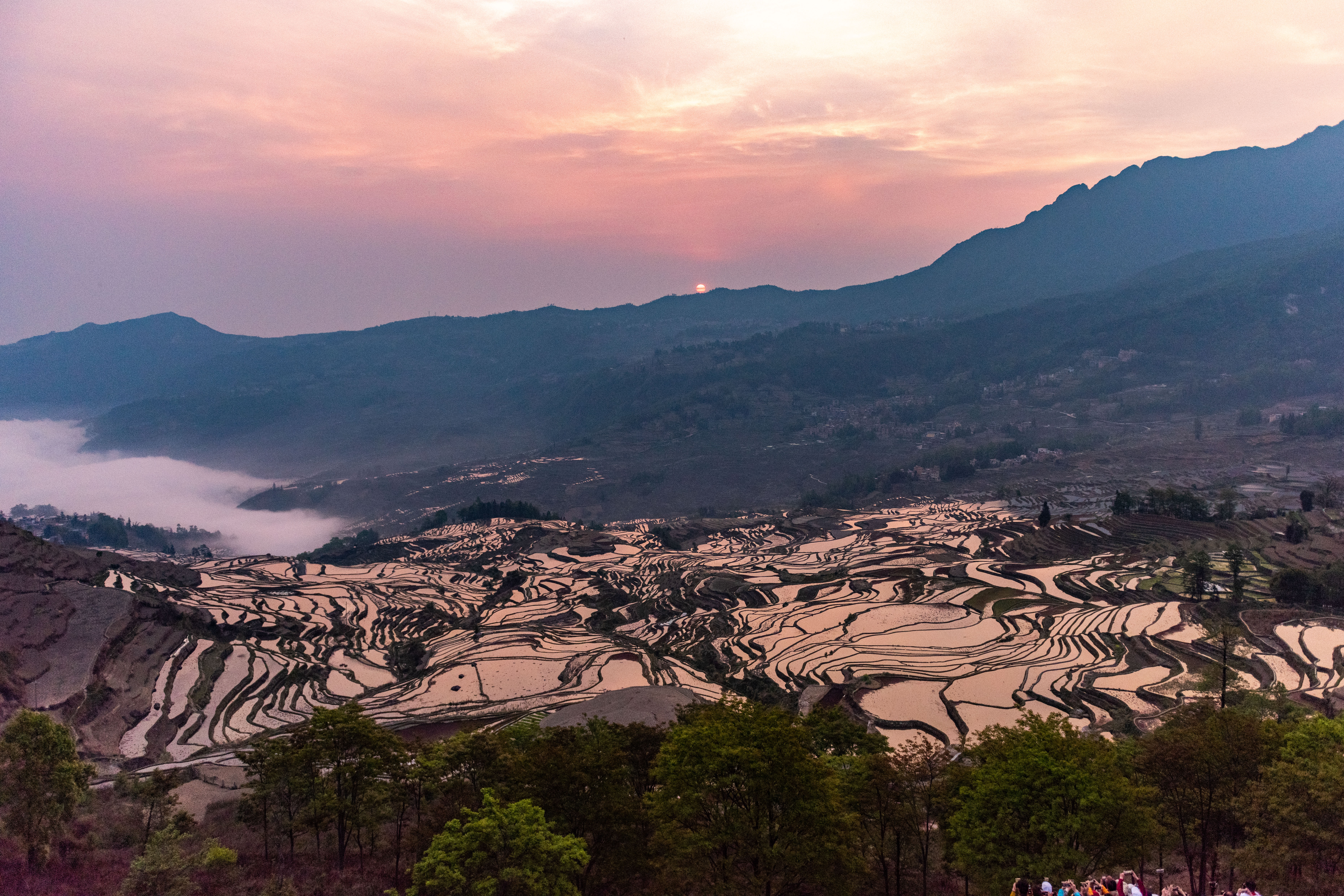
- Hani Rice Terraces among mountains in Yunnan

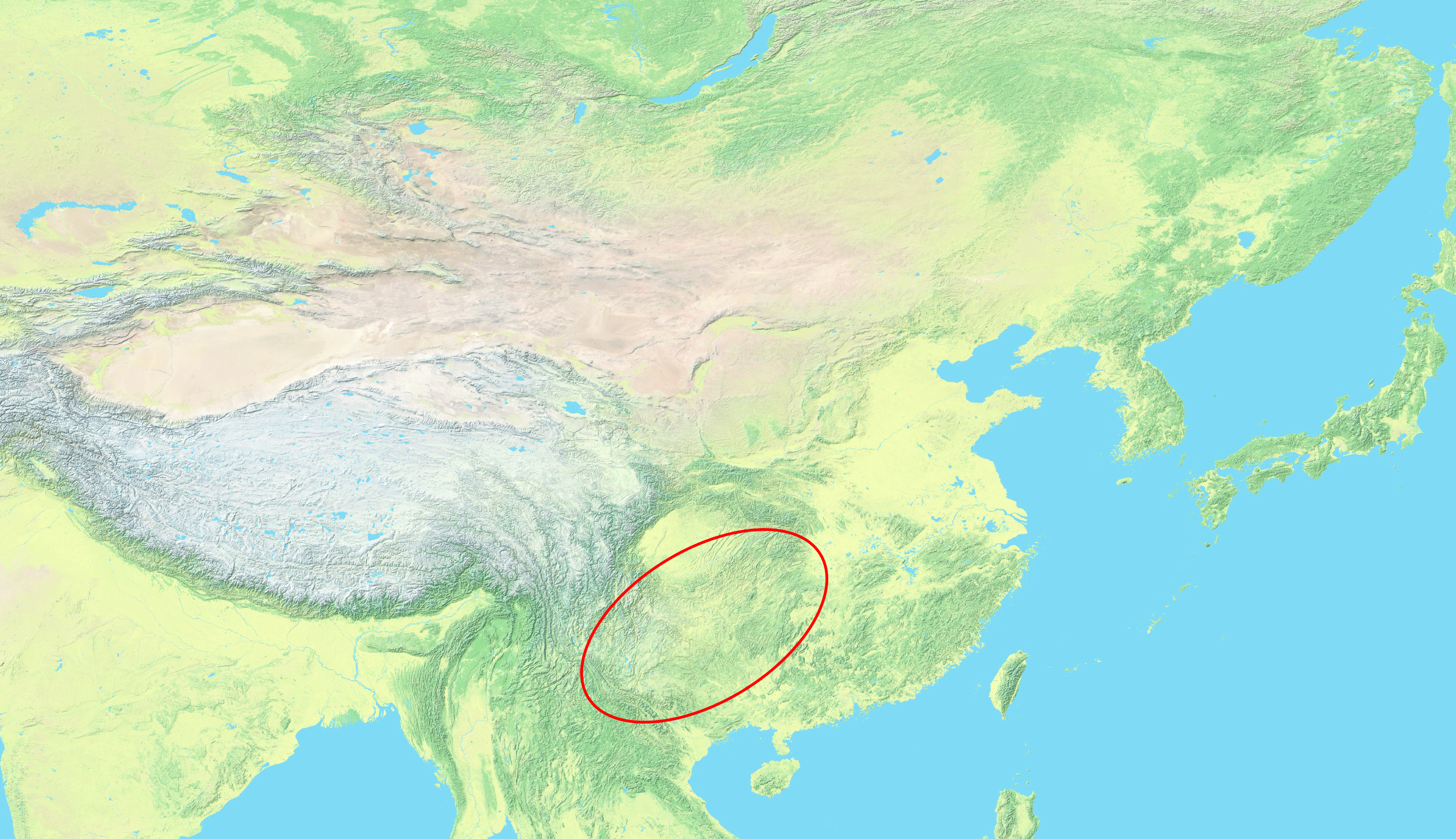
- Topographic map of East Asia with Yungui Plateau highlighted
- Floor elevation: 500 m (1,600 ft) to 2,500 m (8,200 ft)

Geography
- Country: China
- Provinces: Yunnan, Guizhou
- Region: Southwest China
- Coordinates: 26°N 105°E

Yunnan–Guizhou Plateau
- Traditional Chinese: 雲貴高原
- Simplified Chinese: 云贵高原
- Postal: Yunnan–Kweichow Plateau
Transcriptions
Standard Mandarin
- Hanyu Pinyin: Yúnguì Gāoyuán
- Wade–Giles: Yün^{2}-kuei^{4} Kao^{1}-yüan^{2}

Yungui Plateau
- Traditional Chinese: 雲貴高原
- Simplified Chinese: 云贵高原
- Postal: Yunkwei Plateau
Transcriptions
Standard Mandarin
- Hanyu Pinyin: Yúnguì Gāoyuán
- Wade–Giles: Yün^{2}-kuei^{4} Kao^{1}-yüan^{2}

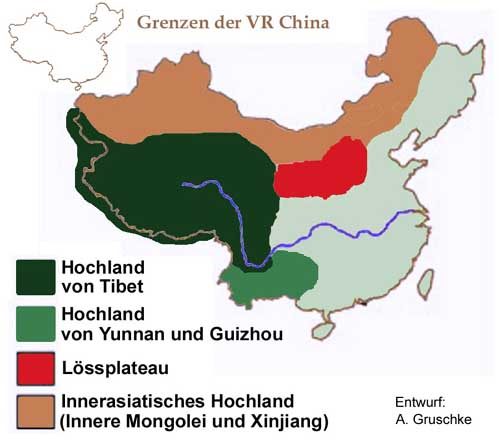
Using a wider definition, the Yunnan–Guizhou Highlands make up the light green area on the lower part of this map

The Yunnan–Guizhou Plateau or Yungui Plateau (simplified Chinese: 云贵高原; traditional Chinese: 雲貴高原; pinyin: Yúnguì Gāoyuán) is a highland region located in southwest China. The region is primarily spread over the provinces of Yunnan and Guizhou. In the southwest, the Yungui is a true plateau with relatively flatter highland areas, while in the northeast, the Yungui is a generally mountainous area of rolling hills, gorges, and karst topography.

== Geography ==
=== Definition ===
Under the strictest definition, the Yungui Plateau stretches from the Red River Fault in Yunnan in the southwest to the Wuling Mountains in Hunan in the northeast. This plateau region includes most of eastern Yunnan and most of Guizhou. It is common, however, for much of the rest of Yunnan and surrounding highland areas to be referred to as part of the Yunnan–Guizhou Plateau even where there are no plateau-like characteristics.

Under the broader definition of the Yungui Plateau, the provinces would include not only Yunnan and Guizhou but also Gulin County and the southernmost extremes of Sichuan, eastern Chongqing, southwestern Hubei, western Hunan, and northwestern Guangxi.

=== Human geography ===
Located in Southwest China, the Yungui Plateau separates the Sichuan Basin from South China. The area has long been considered a backwater region of China. Historically, the plateau has been home to many minority peoples who have traditionally engaged in intensive agriculture along hills and in valleys. Today, the Yungui region is one of the most economically depressed areas of China and both Guizhou and Yunnan provinces are in the bottom three in rankings for the Human Development Index in China. Many residents on the Yungui Plateau live in a traditional fashion in rural villages.

Major cities on the Yungui Plateau include Kunming, Guiyang, and Zunyi. The Yungui Plateau is home to many extreme engineering feats where railways and expressways have been built to traverse the challenging terrain. The world's highest bridge, the Beipanjiang Bridge, is located on the Yunnan-Guizhou border in the heart of the plateau.

=== Physical geography ===
The Yungui Plateau is a large mountainous region with rugged terrain including steep karst peaks and deep gorges. The plateau is buttressed by the large Hengduan Mountains to the northwest and by lowland regions to the north, east, and southeast. Other major mountain ranges cross or surround portions of the Yungui Plateau. The Wumeng Mountains and Wulian Feng form a barrier through north-central Yungui along the Jinsha (Upper Yangtze) River. To the north, the Dalou Mountains run along the Yungui's edge with the Sichuan Basin. The Wuling Mountains in the northeast form a transitional terrain between the plateau and the Yangtze Plain. In the south, the Miao Range steps down to the karst hills of South China. Across the Red River to the southwest, the Ailao Mountains form a definitive barrier.

The high mountain peaks of Eastern Tibet are the source of many of Asia's great rivers, which flow southerly towards the Yunnan–Guizhou Plateau. The rivers split around the plateau, with the Salween and Mekong keeping south and the Yangtze turning northeast. Most of the western Yungui Plateau is drained by the Nanpan and Beipan Rivers, both headwaters of the Pearl River. The eastern Yungui Plateau is largely drained by the Wu River, a tributary of the Yangtze.

Major lakes have formed in the Yunnan portions of the Yungui Plateau, including Dian Chi and Fuxian Lake. Erhai Lake is located on the plateau's western edge at the southern base of the Hengduan Mountains.

== Climate and ecology ==
The climate gradually transitions from drier in the southwest to rainier in the northeast. In east-central Yunnan, parts of the Yungui Plateau experience a semi-arid climate. In most of Guizhou, the climate is classified as humid subtropical. The Yungui Plateau is covered by subtropical evergreen forests for much of its Yunnan portions and by mixed broadleaf forests for the Guizhou portions.

== See also ==
- South China Karst
- Viceroy of Yun-Gui
