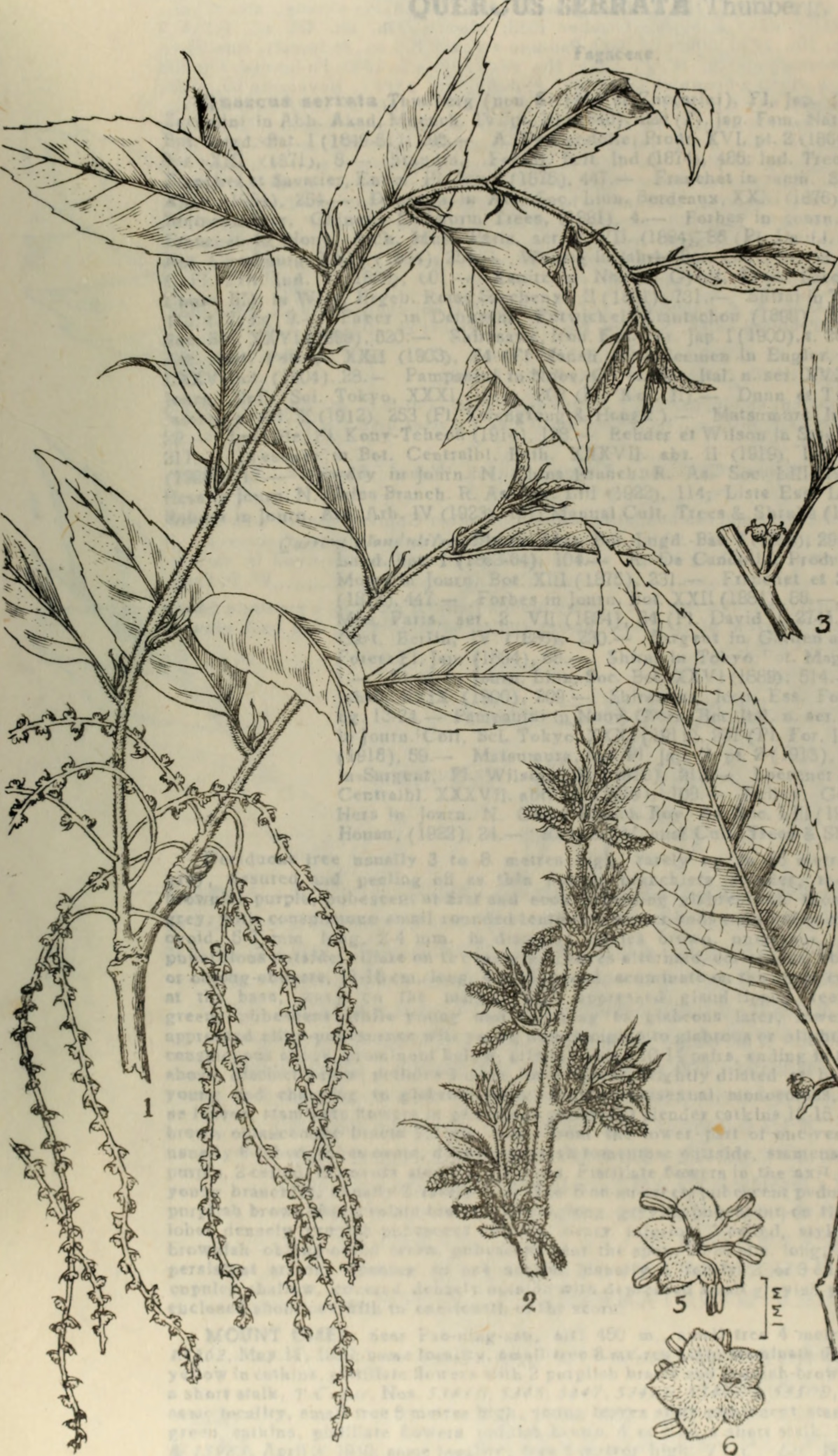
- Botanical illustration

Conservation status
- Least Concern (IUCN 3.1)

Scientific classification
- Kingdom: Plantae
- Clade: Embryophytes
- Clade: Tracheophytes
- Clade: Angiosperms
- Clade: Eudicots
- Clade: Rosids
- Order: Fagales
- Family: Fagaceae
- Genus: Quercus
- Subgenus: Quercus subg. Cerris
- Section: Quercus sect. Ilex
- Species: Q. engleriana

Binomial name
- Quercus engleriana Seemen

Synonyms
- Myrica cavaleriei H.Lév.; Quercus dehangensis G.X.Chen, D.G.Zhang & B.Z.Wang; Quercus dolichostyla A.Camus; Quercus obscura Seemen; Quercus sutchuenensis Franch.

= Quercus engleriana =

Species of plant

Quercus engleriana, Engler's oak, is a species of flowering plant in the family Fagaceae. It is native to Tibet, south-central and southeastern China, the eastern Himalayas, and Myanmar. An evergreen tree reaching 25 m (82 ft), shorter in cultivation, it is typically found in mixed broadleaf/coniferous mesic forests at elevations from 700 to 2,700 m (2,300 to 8,900 ft). It has been assessed as Least Concern.
