= 2022 Luding earthquake =

Earthquake in China

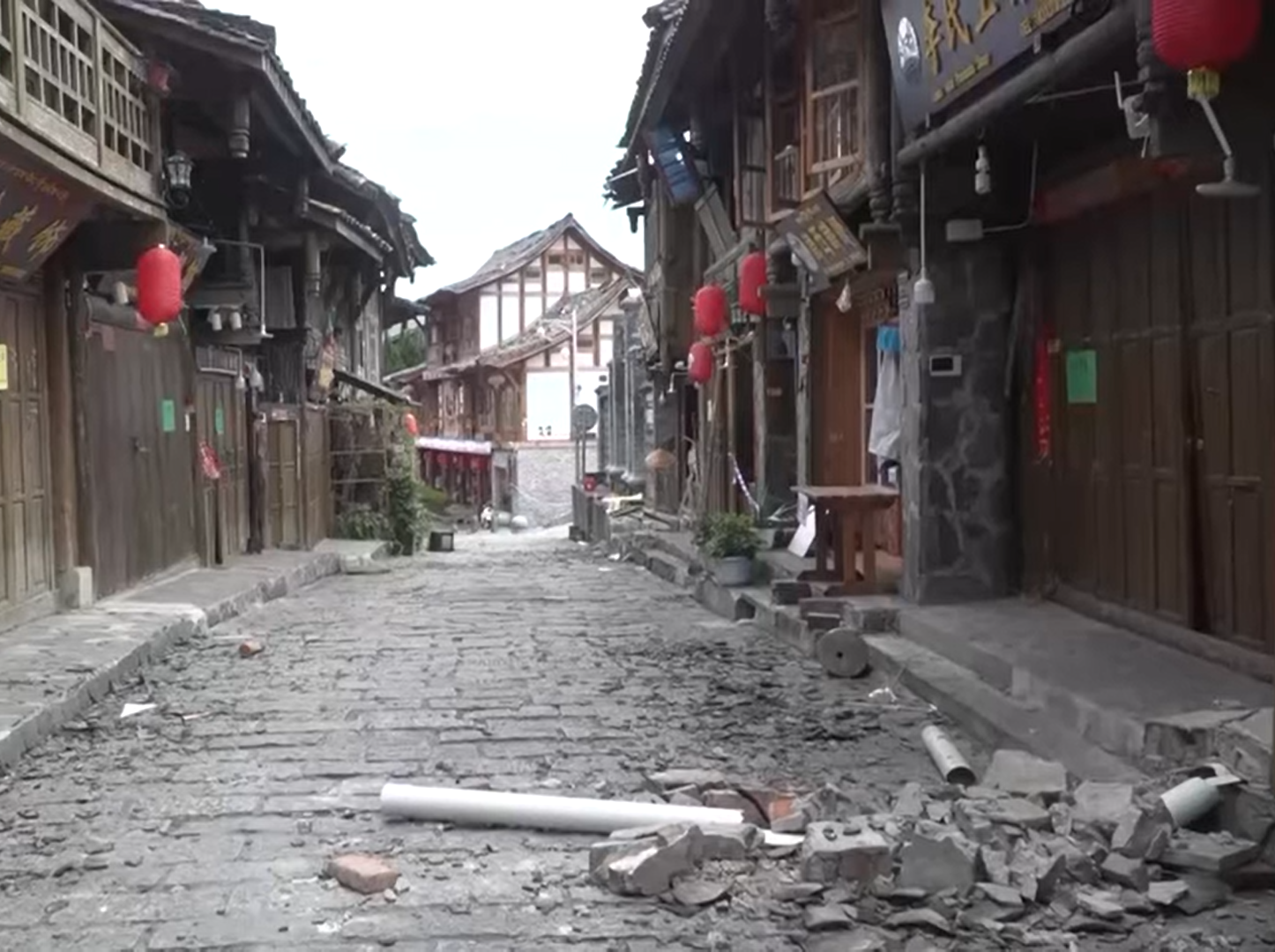
- Damage along a street

- Location within China
- UTC time: 2022-09-05 04:52:19
- ISC event: 624749357
- USGS-ANSS: ComCat
- Local date: 5 September 2022
- Local time: 12:52:19
- Magnitude: M_{w} 6.7, M_{s} 6.8
- Depth: 18.4 km (11.4 mi)
- Epicenter: 29.49°N 102.22°E
- Type: Strike-slip
- Total damage: CN¥ 15.48 billion (US$2.23 billion)
- Max. intensity: CSIS IX (MMI IX)
- Peak acceleration: 0.68 g
- Aftershocks: 6,486 recorded (as of 22 October)
- Casualties: 93 dead, 424 injured

A M_{w} 6.7 (M_{s} 6.8) earthquake struck Luding County in Sichuan province, China on 5 September 2022 at 12:52:19 local time. The epicenter was located 226 km (140 mi) from Chengdu, or 43 km (27 mi) southeast of Kangding. Ninety-three people died and 424 were injured. More than 13,000 homes and other infrastructure were damaged or destroyed. It was the largest earthquake to strike the province since 2017.

== Tectonic setting ==
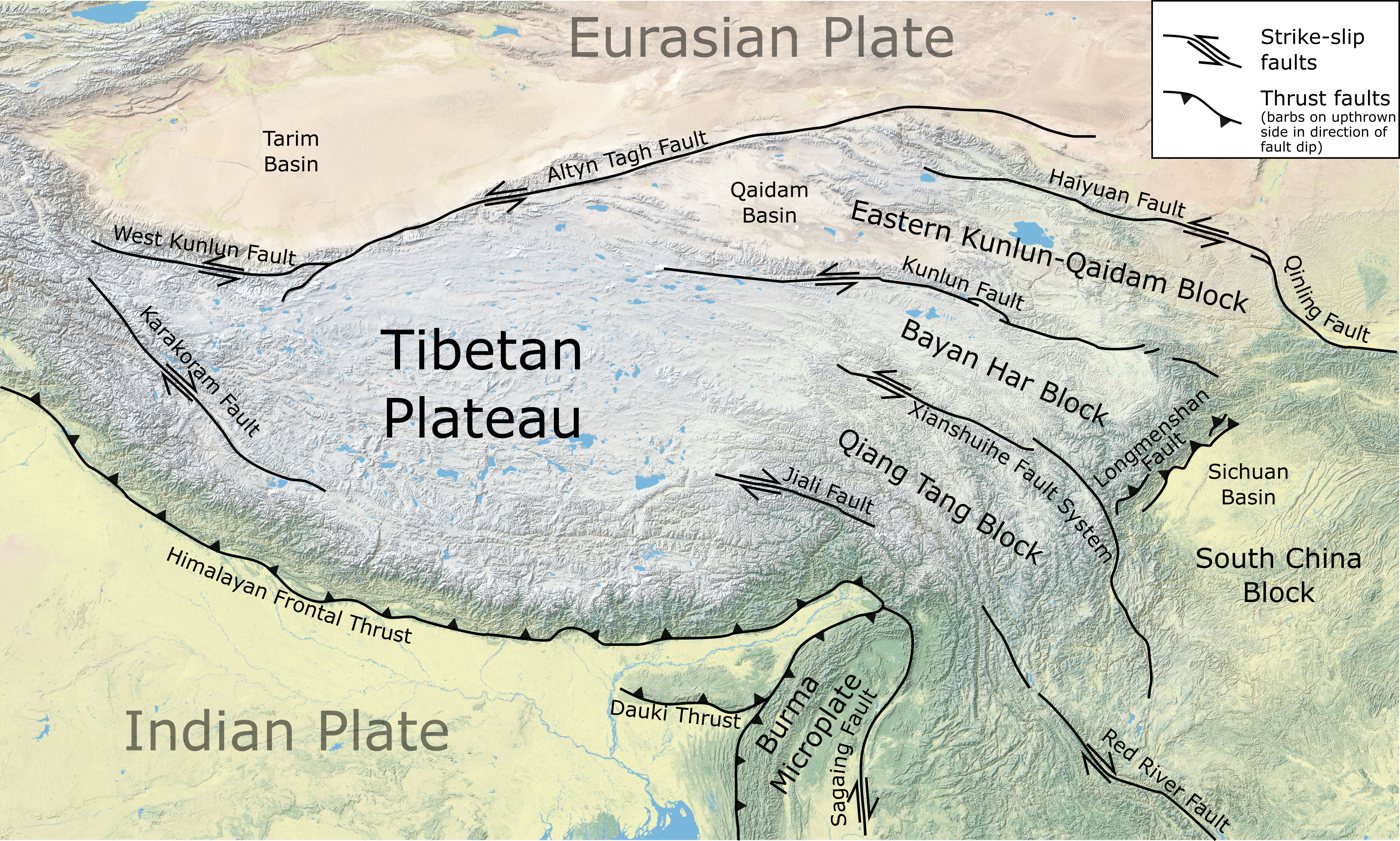
The tectonic overview of the Tibetan Plateau and Sichuan

Sichuan is situated in a complex zone of faulting created by the continued collision of the Indian Plate with the Eurasian Plate. As Himalayan underthrusting continues, the crust of the Eurasian Plate is deformed and uplifted to form the Tibetan Plateau. Instead of thrust faulting to its south, the Tibetan Plateau accommodates deformation through strike-slip escape tectonics. Large amounts of strike-slip motion are accommodated through major faults and their splays along the plateau, such as the Altyn Tagh Fault, Kunlun Fault, Haiyuan Fault, and Xianshuihe fault systems. Left-lateral strike-slip motion squeezes the crustal blocks of the Tibetan Plateau outwards, forcing it to move eastwards. Meanwhile, the strike-slip motion also results in an east–west extension of the plateau, causing normal faults to break within the thickened crust.

On a continental scale, the seismicity of central and eastern Asia is broadly the result of the northward convergence of the Indian Plate against the Eurasian Plate. The convergence of the two plates is accommodated by the uplift of the Asian highlands and by the motion of crustal material to the east away from the uplifted Tibetan Plateau. In the past 20 years, 25 other earthquakes M5.0+ have occurred within 200 km (120 mi) of 5 September 2022, event. Most of this seismicity is related to aftershocks of previous destructive earthquakes in the western margin of the Sichuan Basin. This event is southwest of a cluster of seismicity following an M6.6 earthquake on 20 April 2013 that resulted in 196 fatalities. An M7.9 earthquake on 12 May 2008 occurred near the September event and resulted in over 87,000 fatalities, making it one of the most destructive earthquakes in recent history.

== Earthquake ==
A strong ground motion map by the USGS showing the varying levels of intensities felt across the region relative to the epicenter

The earthquake measured 6.8 on the surface-wave magnitude scale (M_{s}); on the moment magnitude scale (M_{w}), it measured 6.7. According to the United States Geological Survey, the earthquake was a result of shallow strike-slip faulting on the western margin of the Sichuan Basin. The earthquake occurred on either an NNW–SSE striking, steep WSW dipping left-lateral fault, or a WSW–ENE striking, near vertical dipping right-lateral fault. The location and sense of motion are consistent with movement on or near the left-lateral Xianshuihe fault system, which runs for 350 km (220 mi). Many faults in this region are related to the convergence of crustal material slowly moving from the high Tibetan Plateau to the west, against the strong crust underlying the Sichuan Basin and southeastern China.

Experts from the Sichuan Earthquake Administration said the earthquake occurred near the Moxi Fault, a segment of the southeastern Xianshuihe fault zone. They added that it is unlikely that a larger earthquake will occur near the epicenter, but aftershocks would persist. The Xianshuihe fault zone is a large active left-lateral fault that defines the margin between the Bayan Har and the Sichuan-Yunnan blocks. It produced destructive earthquakes in 1786 (M7.75), 1816 (M7.5), 1850 (7.5), 1893 (M7.0), 1904 (M7.0), 1923 (M7.3), 1948 (7.3), 1955 (M7.5), 1973 (M7.6), 1981 (M6.9) and 2014 (M6.3). No M7.0+ earthquakes have been recorded along the Moxi Fault since 1786. It runs north–south between Kangding and Shimian. The fault was considered a potential source for large earthquakes due to the absence of any since 1786.

A 45 km (28 mi) length along a NNW–SSE striking fault corresponded to the rupture with a maximum slip of 1.02 m (3 ft 4 in). Most of the seismic moment was released within the first 10 seconds of the rupture initiating, which then propagated to the southwest. At least 2,715 aftershocks were recorded until 12 September, at depths of 5–15 km (3.1–9.3 mi) and distributed along a north–northwest trend. On 22 October, a M_{ww} 5.3 aftershock was recorded near Moxi Town. It had an epicenter 5 km (3.1 mi) away from the mainshock. By 22 October, 6,486 aftershocks had been recorded. A M_{ww} 5.5 aftershock occurred with an epicenter 8 km (5.0 mi) from that of the mainshock's on 26 January.

Using broadband seismic networks, the total rupture duration was calculated at 16 seconds, releasing 4.1×10^{14} J of energy. An energy magnitude (M_{e}) of 6.8 was determined. As the M_{e} value is larger than M_{w} (6.7), the earthquake likely released seismic energy in an efficient manner. It may have resulted in more extreme ground shaking compared to earthquakes with similar M_{w} values.

=== Strong ground motion ===
Strong ground motion data was recorded at four accelerographs at Hailuogou, Moxi Town, Detuo and Yanzigou. Three accelerographs, namely those in Hailuogou, Moxi Town and Detuo, contributed to the earthquake early warning. The Hailuogou accelerograph which was nearest to the epicenter recorded the highest peak ground acceleration (pga)—0.68 g in the north–south component. The pga values at Hailuogou, Moxi Town and Detuo slightly exceeded the limit considered for earthquakes in the area. In addition, the highest peak ground velocity (pgv) was 61.2 cm (24.1 in)/s in the east–west component, recorded at Moxi Town. The vertical component pgv was at the town 44.9 cm (17.7 in)/s.

== Impact ==
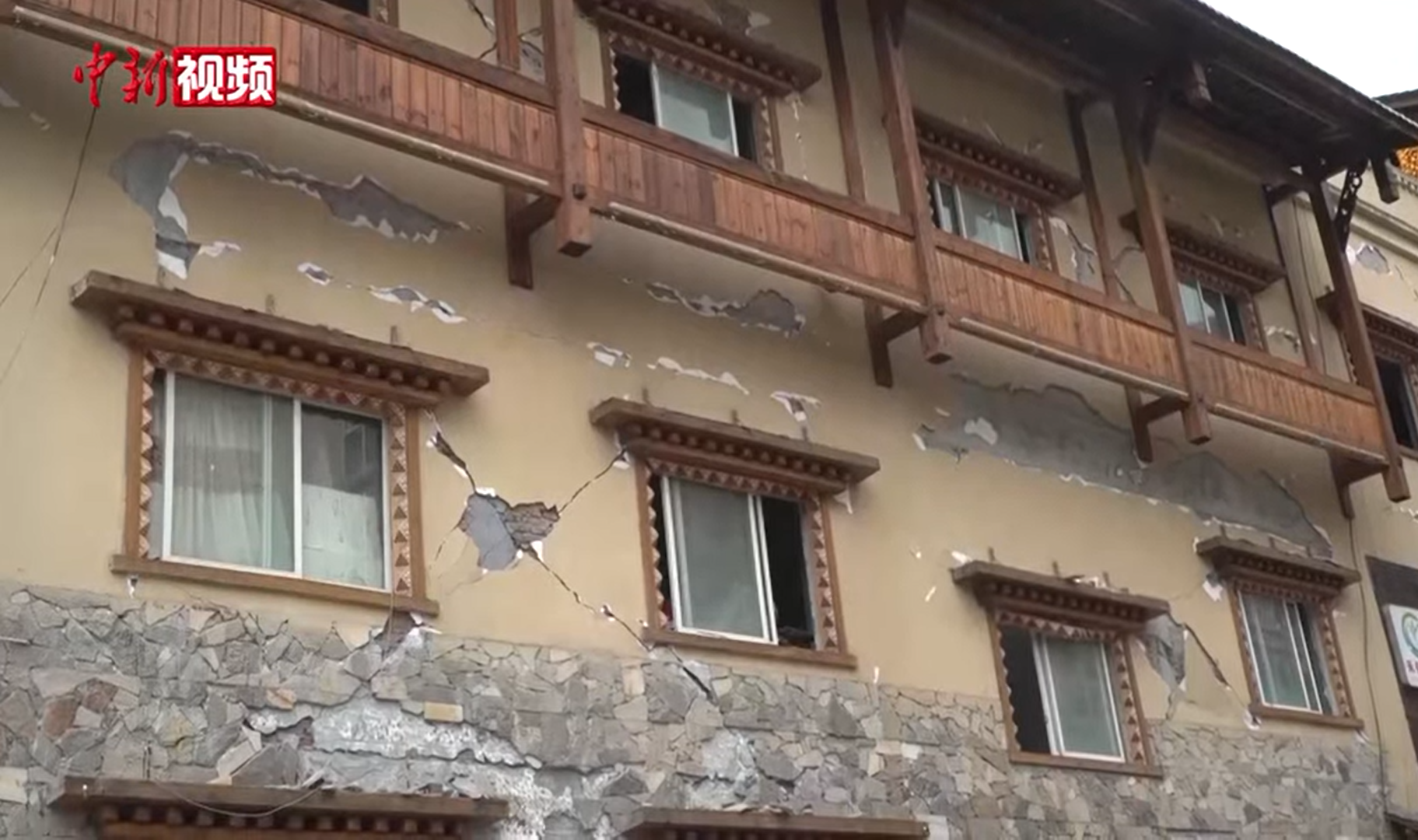
Damage to a building's facade

The earthquake struck Sichuan province while its COVID-19 lockdown was in effect. It followed a drought and heat wave which had affected water and power supplies due to the province's dependency on hydropower. Two earthquakes in June caused at least four deaths.

=== Casualties ===
At least 93 people were killed, and 424 were injured. Provincial officials reported 55 fatalities and 264 injuries in Ganzi Prefecture. Three park employees of Hailuogou National Geological Park were among the dead. The Alpine Ecosystem Observation and Experiment Station of Gongga Mountain, a research facility, partially collapsed, killing a graduate student, and injuring three. Most of the casualties were attributed to collapsing homes while some were buried by landslides as they walked on roads. Some received minor injuries due to rockfalls. Eight people from the county received medical attention at West China Medical Center in Chengdu.

A further 38 people in Shimian County (Ya'an Prefecture) died and 158 were injured; including six fatalities and 11 injuries reported in Caoke; 24 fatalities and 27 injured in Wanggangping; seven fatalities and another seven injured in Xinmin. At Xinmian, 33 were injured. Five people were injured in Hanyuan County. One person was also injured in Liangshan Prefecture. The injured were treated at a hospital. Seventeen days after the earthquake, an injured survivor was located by a resident and rescued.

=== Damage ===
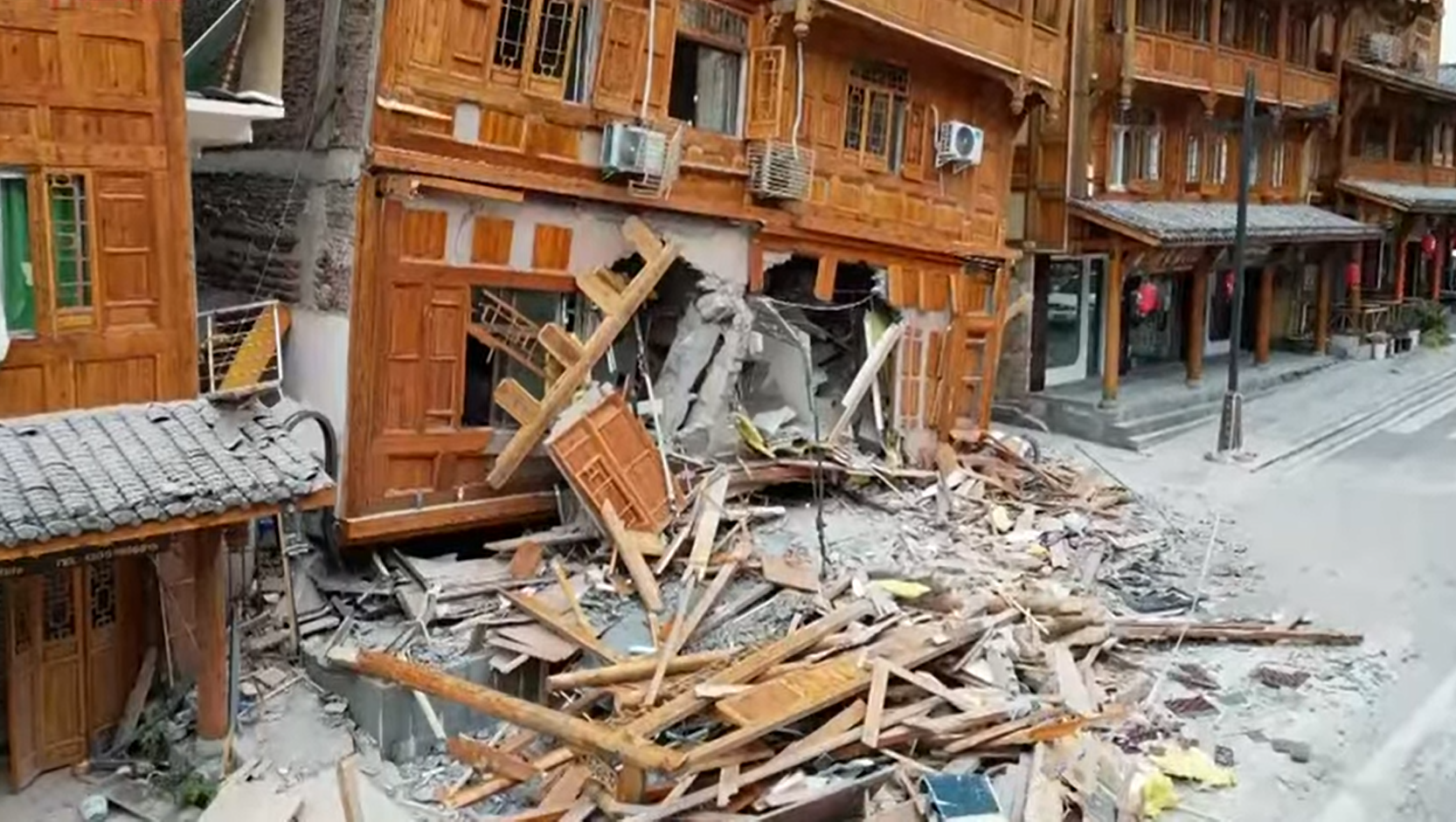
Building damaged in Moxi Town

A preliminary evaluation of damage revealed 243 homes collapsed and a further 13,010 were damaged. Two pieces of public infrastructure were destroyed and 142 were damaged. The earthquake also destroyed four hotels and damaged an additional 307. Slope failures caused roads to collapse. Seven small to medium-sized hydropower stations were heavily damaged. Water supply systems were also affected. Many towns and villages were damaged to varying extents. Preliminary reports indicate communication services were down in the towns of Moxi and Yanzigou. At Detuo, landslides severely damaged many homes. Roads were damaged at Lengmoan. Roads were badly damaged so rescuers had to reach the town by boats. The total economic loss was estimated at CN¥ 15.48 billion (US$2.23 billion).

Satellite imagery and a field investigation revealed 4,528 earthquake-triggered landslides over a 2,000 km^{2} (770 sq mi) area. The total area of landslides was 28.1 km^{2} (10.8 sq mi). In Luding County, a section of Sichuan Provincial Highway 211 was buried under a landslide while another was obstructed by rockfalls. These roads were cleared by officials immediately. Although there was no damage to dams and hydropower facilities, damaged powerlines affected 43,158 customers. About 55 km (34 mi) of optical cables and 289 communication stations were damaged, interrupting communication systems to 35,000 homes. Nine electrical substations remained out of operation and three were damaged. At least 57 electric transmission cables tripped. More than 200 people were trapped at Hailuogou National Geological Park. Thousands were trapped when a landslide blocked the confluence of the Dadu and Wandong rivers, forming a lake. Residents living downstream were evacuated. On the morning of 6 September, the lake overflowed, discharging water at a rate of 150–200 m^{3} (5,300–7,100 cu ft)/s. Twelve hours later, the rate decreased to 10–15 m^{3} (350–530 cu ft)/s.

The earthquake-produced shaking assigned a maximum seismic intensity (CSIS) of IX over the mountainous northwestern region of the province. It was felt in the towns of Moxi, Yanzigou and Dewei in Luding County for 280 km^{2} (110 sq mi). The maximum CSIS felt in Ya'an Prefecture was VII. CSIS VI was felt over a 14,696 km^{2} (5,674 sq mi) area by 580,000 people. The earthquake was felt several hundred kilometers away in Changsha, Hunan province, and Xi'an, Shaanxi province. Shaking in Luding was reportedly so intense that people faced difficulties trying to remain standing.

CSIS in selected locations
| CSIS | city/county | Location |
| IX | Luding County, Garzê Tibetan Autonomous Prefecture | Moxi, Detuo, Yanzigou, Dewei |
| IX | Shimian County, Ya'an | Wanggangping Yizu Zangzu Township, Caoke Tibetan Township, Xinmin Tibetan Yi Township |
| VIII | Luding County, Garzê Tibetan Autonomous Prefecture | Moxi, Yanzigou, Deto, Dewei |
| VIII | Shimian County, Ya'an | Wanggangping Yizu Zangzu Township, Caoke Tibetan Township, Xinmin Tibetan Yi Township |
| VII | Luding County, Garzê Tibetan Autonomous Prefecture | Yanzigou, Luqiao, Dewei Town, Moxi, Lengqi, Xinglong, Deto, Pengba |
| VII | Kangding, Garzê Tibetan Autonomous Prefecture | Yulin, Gonggashanxiang |
| VII | Jiulong County, Garzê Tibetan Autonomous Prefecture | Hongbaxiang, Wanbaxiang |
| VII | Shimian County, Ya'an | Caoke Tibetan Township, Xieluoxiang, Anshunxiang, Wanggangping Yizu Zangzu Township, Fengle Township, Xinmian Street, Yingzheng Township, Meiluo, Xinmin Tibetan Yi Township, Yonghe Township |
| VII | Hanyuan County, Ya'an | Yidong Town, Fuxiang Township, Qianyu Town |
| VII | Yingjing County, Ya'an | Niubeishan |
| VII | Tianquan County, Ya'an | Louhe |

== Response ==
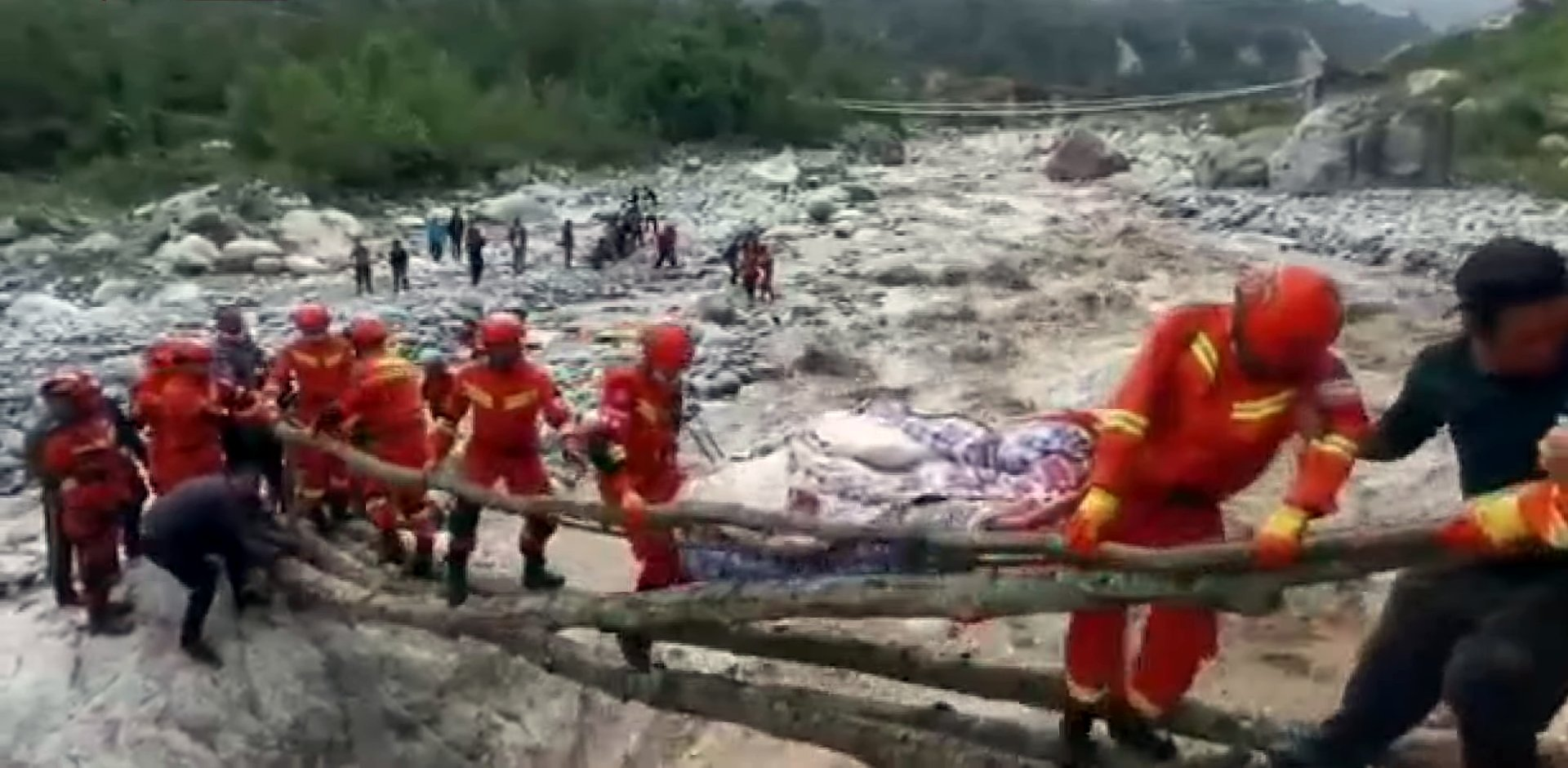
Emergency workers rescuing injured villagers in Moxi, Luding County

An earthquake early warning was activated four seconds after the mainshock was initiated. Residents in Kangding, 53 km (33 mi) away, were given seven seconds of warning before shaking occurred. At Ya'an and Chengdu, 20 seconds and 50 seconds of warning were given, respectively. These warnings were broadcast through loudspeakers, mobile phones, and televisions. Xi Jinping, the General Secretary of the Chinese Communist Party, asked local officials to "make saving lives the first priority, go all out to rescue people in disaster-stricken areas and minimise loss of life". Li Keqiang, the Premier of the State Council, urged a "swift evaluation of the situation, as well as all-out rescue and medical treatment efforts".

=== Emergency response ===
Emergency management officials from Luding County were dispatched to verify casualties and evaluate the damage. Officials prevented vehicle entry into China National Highway 318 to ensure rescue roadways were unblocked. Railway services including C6633, D1919, and G8792, operated by the China Railway Chengdu Group, were delayed for damage inspections. Affected passengers were refunded.

The Ministry of Emergency Management and the National Committee for Disaster Reduction issued a Level IV emergency response to the area. More than 6,500 emergency rescue personnel from Ganzi, Chengdu, Deyang, Leshan, Ya'an, Meishan, and Ziyang were dispatched to the epicenter. In addition, 370 fire trucks and construction vehicles, nine rescue helicopters, three drones, and 31 rescue equipment were deployed.

In Moxi, personnel from the Sichuan Forest Fire Brigade rescued trapped residents from the rubble and transported the injured over a river. At least 50 people who were injured received treatment by medical teams. Emergency personnel pulled over 30 people trapped beneath debris. Rescuers had to dig through the debris by hand as rescue equipment was unable to pass through narrow passageways.

Rescuers pulled three survivors and one body from the rubble of a collapsed hotel in Moxi. Rescuers also located survivors trapped beneath a collapsed bridge in Detuo. All 219 people previously trapped for over 50 hours at Hailuogou National Geological Park were successfully evacuated to Moxi via helicopter.

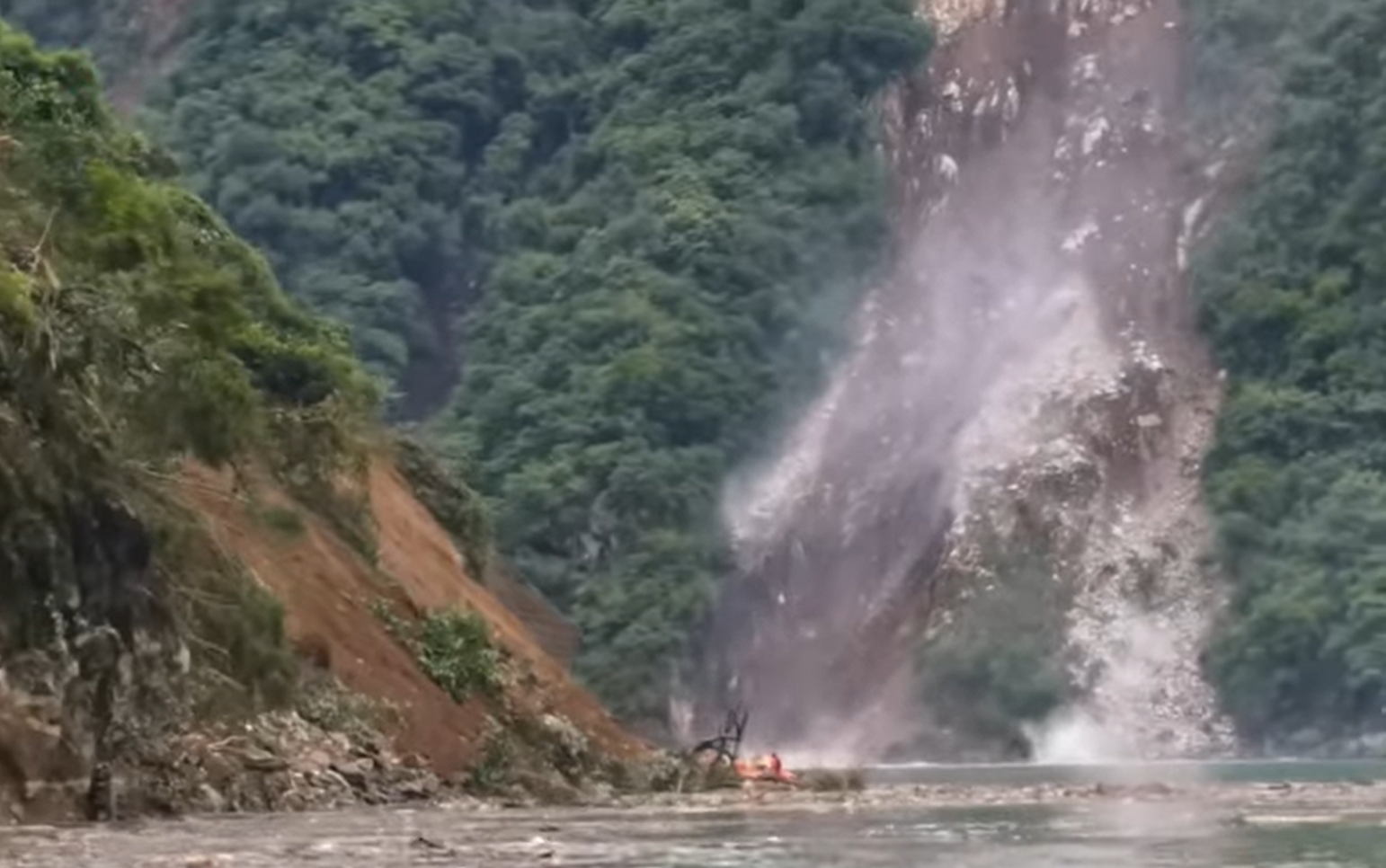
Landslides which dammed part of a river

Firefighters used rubber boats to reach affected villages. At Ziyachang and Wandong villages, 17 people were evacuated. Firefighters were also observing the dammed lake and warned residents to evacuate. Rescuers evacuated over 900 residents in Qinggangping, a village near Moxi which was threatened by rapid-flowing water. Local authorities were concerned over the possibility of more landslides forming pools of water in rivers elsewhere. Officials said that the extent of damage on the Dadu River remains unknown but was being monitored. The river was later discharged but the affected residents had already evacuated.

Wet weather conditions and mudflows have disrupted rescuers' attempts to search for the missing. China's meteorological administration issued a yellow alert warning of the possibility of "geological disasters". Heavy downpours were expected in some areas while moderate precipitation was forecasted for several days. The administration added that "post-earthquake geological conditions are inherently fragile, and the impact of additional rainfall may lead to landslides and mudslides". Aftershocks triggered additional landslides.

=== Relief efforts ===
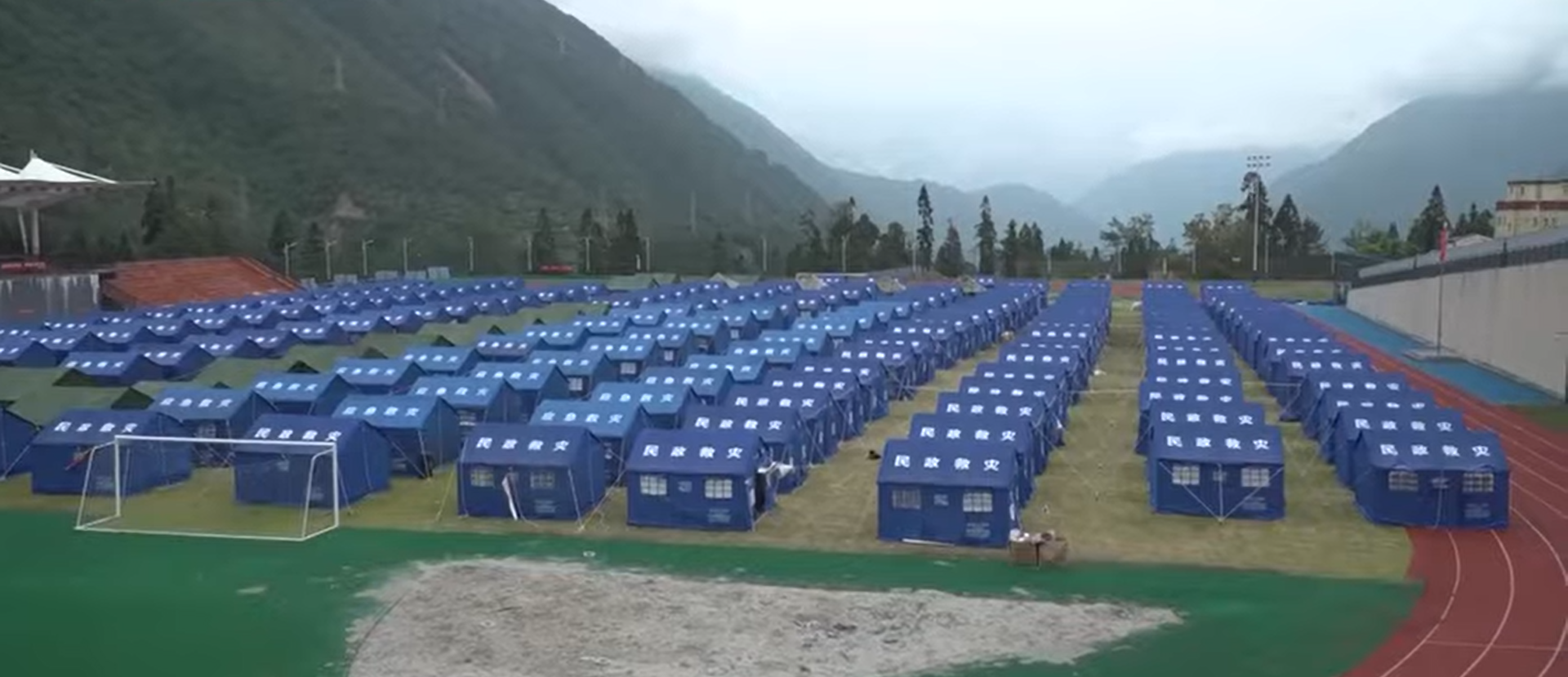
Temporary shelters to house affected residents

On 5 September, the Chinese government reserved 50 million yuan (US$7,250,000) for relief efforts. An additional 150 million yuan (US$21,602,010) was provided on 9 September. Officials of Sichuan also allocated 50 million yuan to Ganzi. The Red Cross Society of China provided 1 million yuan (US$143,000), 450 tents, 3,000 relief packages, 2,400 beds, and 1,200 blankets. In addition, more than 150 members of the organization responded to the crisis. Donations from 65 businesses to assist in recovery efforts totaled 1.168 billion yuan (US$167,435,988), according to SASAC. Wuliangye donated 15 million yuan (US$2,200,000) while BYD donated 5 million yuan (US$718,000).

Over 3,600 people and 70 search and rescue dogs from Chongqing, Gansu, Guizhou, Yunnan, Qinghai, and other nearby regions were put on standby for possible interregional efforts. The State Reserve Bureau and Ministry of Emergency Management allocated 3,000 tents, 10,000 quilts, 10,000 beds, and other relief supplies to relocate residents of Luding County. More than 50,000 residents in Ganzi and Ya'an were evacuated, and 22,000 were relocated across 124 makeshift settlements.

Roads giving way to the epicenter region had reopened, allowing traffic to resume by 7 September. Officials in Luding County said that its lithium battery factories were unaffected. Most commercial and industrial operations had resumed. The China Conservation and Research Center for the Giant Panda said that all four panda facilities across the province were unaffected. PetroChina operated three gas stations at its facilities in Kangding and Ganzi to ensure its supply for disaster relief. Trucks were also utilized to mobilize oil to the region. By 8 September, power was restored to 34,184 households or about 80 percent of Ganzi and Ya'an prefectures. China Tower said that 211 of its 398 mobile communication facilities lost power while two were out of service. In response, 138 repair specialists, 59 vehicles, and 116 generators were dispatched to the area.

Taiwan's fire department said that 40 rescuers, a search dog, and five tonnes of equipment were on standby if assistance was needed. CEO of Apple, Tim Cook, said that the company pledged to donate to relief efforts, although the amount of money was not disclosed.

=== SWAT response and missing SWAT officers ===
China News Service video of SWAT officers arriving at Moxi

In September 7, over 240 SWAT officers from the Garze Prefecture Public Security Bureau were deployed to assist with disaster relief.

Over 30 SWAT officers were deployed to Hailuogou, which was one of the hardest hit areas, with the only entry route being heavily damaged. SWAT officers evacuated over 216 residents, however by Noon of September 8 weather had changed, cutting out communications with 24 SWAT officers for 21 hours, leading to beliefs that they were missing. By 9:00 AM, September 9, connections were opened again; The SWAT officers were evacuated via helicopter in 9:03 AM, September 10, and arrived at Moxi in 9:38.

During the time where they were missing, the 24 SWAT officers were nicknamed "24 Heroes of the Disaster Zone"(孤島24勇士).

== COVID-19 response ==
An announcement by the officials of Ganzi Prefecture in response to COVID-19

When the earthquake struck, residents in Chengdu who attempted to flee their homes found the exits to these buildings locked. Under China's Zero-COVID response and stringent lockdown rules, apartment blocks were locked to keep residents indoors. Videos of these incidents, where frightened residents were locked from inside their apartments, circulated online and sparked anger among netizens. In response, the Chengdu Health Commission said "priority should be given to safeguarding the lives of the public in the event of earthquakes, fires, floods and other disasters".

The Ganzi Prefecture Emergency Command for the New Coronary Pneumonia Epidemic issued a statement on WeChat to prevent a local epidemic in the disaster-stricken area. The statement stated that rescue workers were required to present a negative nucleic acid test certificate within 24 hours and a green health code. Rescuers also had to make sure they did not travel to cities with COVID-19 cases. Rescue workers would have to undergo an inspection at checkpoints before carrying out rescue missions. Authorities placed the affected area under temporary restrictions, prohibiting the public from entering. Survivors were regularly tested for COVID-19 every day and had to disclose their travel history by logging their location on a mobile app. Residents of the area also needed to present approval documents to local authorities before entering.

== Aftermath ==
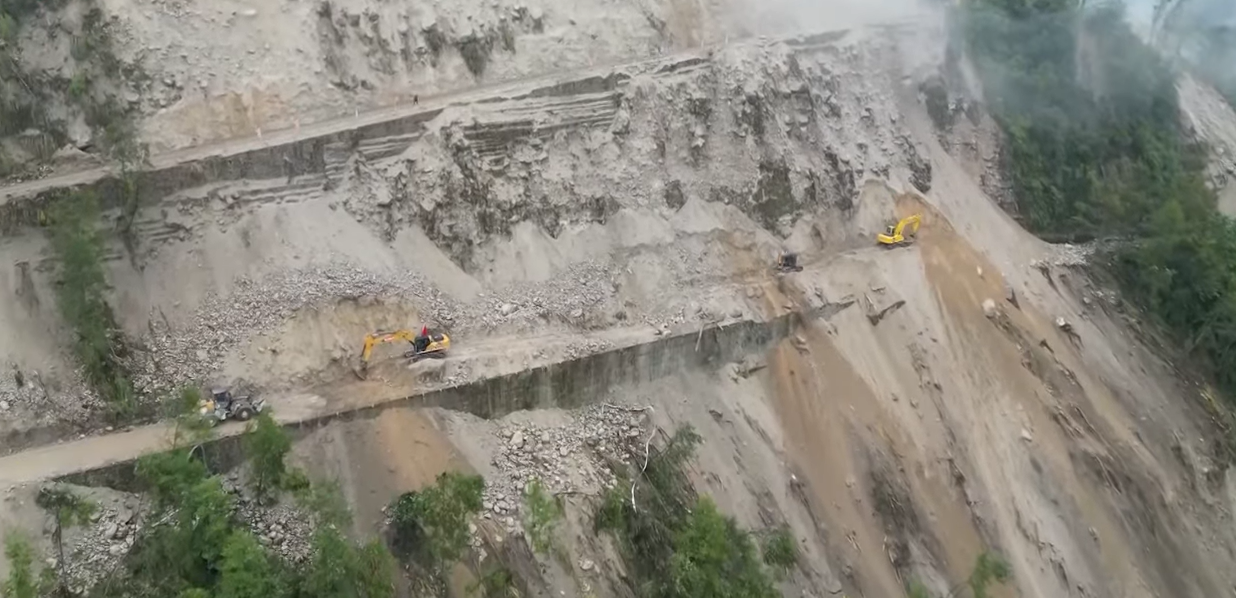
Excavators clearing landslide debris along a road in Moxi

Memorial services were held on 12 September, at 12:52 in Sichuan in remembrance of the earthquake victims. Air raid sirens and vehicle horns sounded as part of the mourning ceremony. Government officials, personnel from the People's Liberation Army, rescue personnel, and members of the public brought flowers to commemorate the victims. Politicians including Wang Xiaohui and Sichuan's governor Huang Qiang were present during the service. Psychological assistance was provided for survivors.

By 13 September, electricity and communication services had returned. Officials also reduced the emergency level in the affected area. More than 10,000 students unable to return to school received lessons via online classes. All classes were resumed on 14 September, some lessons were conducted at off-campus locations.

The M_{ww} 5.3 aftershock on 22 October triggered significant rockfalls and damaged homes in Moxi Town. The Sichuan Provincial Forest Fire Department was deployed to respond to the aftershock.

== See also ==
- List of earthquakes in 2022
- List of earthquakes in China
- List of earthquakes in Sichuan
- Geology of China
- Geology of the Himalayas
