= St. Anne's Church, Moxi =

- Moxi Catholic Church
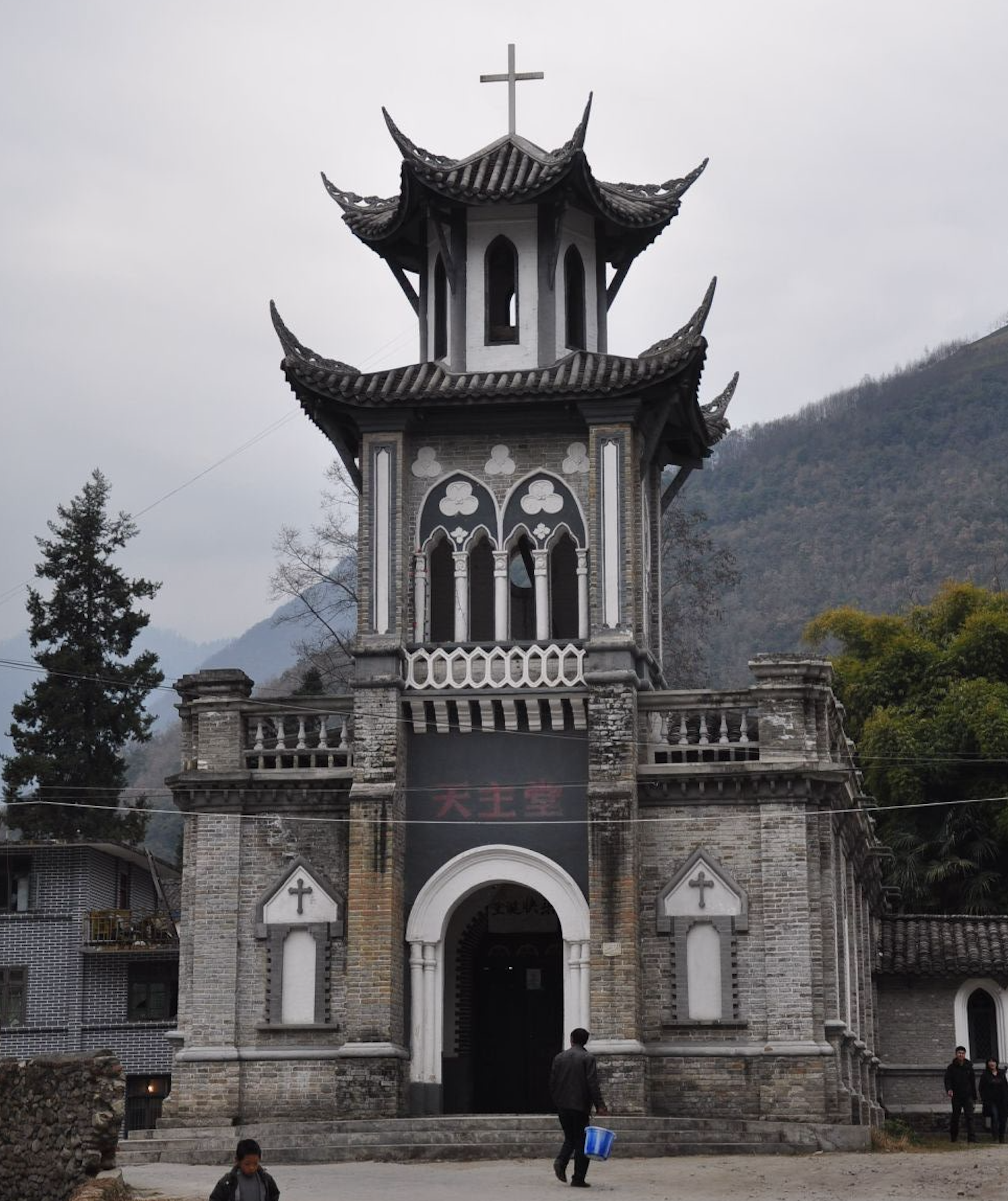
- St. Anne's Church, Moxi
- 29°38′42″N 102°07′26″E
- Location: Moxi, Luding, Garzê, Sichuan
- Country: China
- Denomination: Catholic Church

History
- Status: Church
- Founded: 19th century
- Founder: Paris Foreign Missions Society
- Dedication: Saint Anne

Architecture
- Functional status: Active
- Style: Gothic Revival; Sichuan-Tibetan
- Groundbreaking: Late 19th century (first building); 1930 (second building)
- Completed: 1930s

Administration
- Archdiocese: Chongqing
- Diocese: Kangding

Clergy
- Bishop: Sede vacante
- Priest: Huang Yusong

St. Anne's Church, commonly referred to as Moxi Catholic Church, is a Catholic church in the Sichuanese Tibetan town of Moxi, (Note: Formerly known as Moximian, and romanized as Mosimien or Mosymien. Tibetan name: Boxab.) southwestern China. The church was built in the late 19th century by Paris Foreign Missions Society, and was renovated and expanded in 1930. Originally housing the mission of Moxi, it has been controlled by the state-sanctioned Chinese Catholic Patriotic Association since 1957.

== History ==
=== Origin ===
The small town of Moxi is located on the eastern slope of Mount Konka, on the border between Sichuan (Note: Formerly romanized in English as Szechwan, and in French as Su-tchuen.) and eastern Tibet. The district of Moxi was part of the Apostolic Vicariate of Lhasa (now Diocese of Kangding) erected on March 27, 1846, with the brief Ex debito from Pope Gregory XVI. Evangelization was entrusted to the missionaries of Paris Foreign Missions Society.

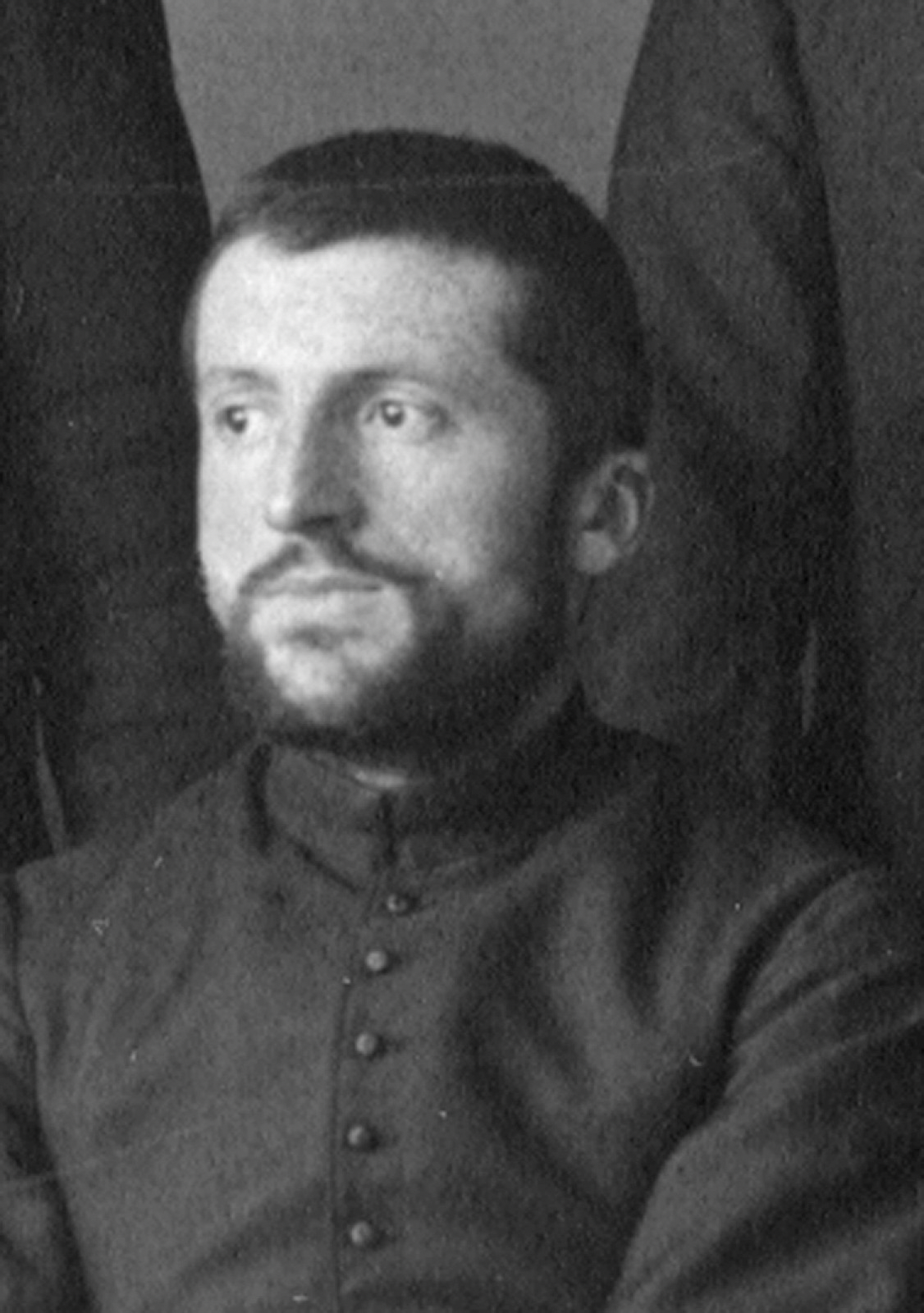
Joseph-Paul Ménard, restorer of St. Anne's

Originally built at the end of the 19th century as a wooden chapel, it was falling apart by 1930. The façade, more exposed to the inclement weather of the seasons, was falling into ruins, the building was no longer sufficient for the needs of worship. According to a 1930 missionary report, "Mr. Ménard [Joseph-Paul Ménard, 1889–1932], in charge of the district, undertook to expand and restore the chapel. The plank walls have given way to brick walls, and a new façade, in good Chinese style, topped with a bell tower, is admired by the Christian and even pagan population. This new church was solemnly blessed on the Octave of Saint Anne, patron saint of the district."

Some Franciscan missionaries of Mary helped in building various pavilions and an atrium of Spanish style topped by angel statues. The construction and beautification of the church, filled with statues and symbolism, took almost five years to complete.

=== Beheaded missionaries ===
The same year (1930), a Valencian Franciscan from Pego, Spain, Pascual Nadal Oltra, joined the Mission of Moxi working as a stonemason and sculptor. With the support of the Apostolic Vicar of Tatsienlu Pierre-Philippe Giraudeau and his coadjutor Pierre Valentin, Oltra subsequently became one of the founders of the leper colony that would be organized around the church, together with Plácido Albiero, the Father Superior; Bernabé Lafond, a Canadian friar; and José Andreatta, an Italian missionary. As a sculptor, his last work for the parish of Moxi was a Madonna of Consolation, before being taken prisoner by communist troops.

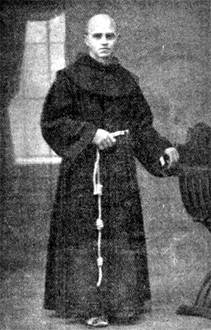
José Pascual Nadal y Oltra

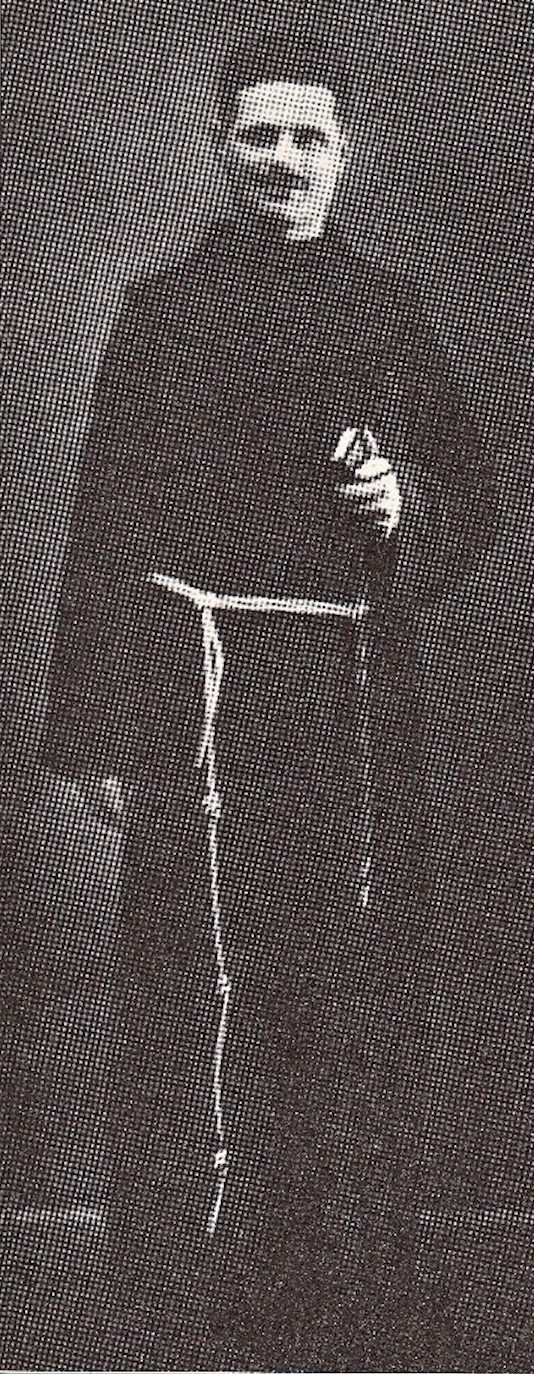
Epifanio Pegoraro

Franciscan missionaries beheaded in 1935 in Tsanlha, Ngawa, one of the three Tibetan regions of western Sichuan.

In May 1935, a communist army column led by Mao Zedong was fleeing Chiang Kai-shek's nationalist army to northwestern China through the Moxi area, part of a military retreat later known as the Long March. Mao settled for a few days in the Franciscan residence next to the church, where the communists held the "Moxi conference". The residence is now designated a museum of the revolution and the Long March. Mao wanted to meet all the missionaries who had been stationed there, including two who were not far away tending the leper colony — Oltra and an Italian Franciscan friar, Epifanio Pegoraro from Montecchio Maggiore.

The Valencian Franciscan friar José Miguel Barrachina Lapiedra stated in his book Fray Pascual Nadal y Oltra: Apóstol de los leprosos, mártir de China, that the communist soldiers looted the residence and arrested the friars and sisters after entering the leper colony. Many of the lepers tried to defend the missionaries, but they were shot by the soldiers. The Franciscans were then brought before Mao, who interrogated them, imprisoned two of them — Pascual Nadal Oltra and Epifanio Pegoraro — and released the rest. Malaya Catholic Leader, the official newspaper of the Archdiocese of Singapore, reported the number of soldiers in the red army was more than 30,000, "including a large number of women." Before their departure, the soldiers ransacked the village in the Moxi valley, every article deemed worth carrying away had been taken. The people of the district were left without means of subsistence. Days later, on December 4, 1935, the army reached Leang Ho Kow, Tsanlha, where the two Franciscans were beheaded with a sword before the astounded gaze of several neighbors, who witnessed the execution from their homes. One of the witnesses buried the bodies. Despite the ransacking and executions, the church recovered and continued tending to the sick; in 1937 they tended to 148 people.

In 2006, an investigation was carried out into the martyrdom of Pascual Nadal y Oltra. According to the Valencian Franciscan historian Benjamín Agulló Pascual, during the investigation in China, they encountered great difficulties in accessing new oral and written testimonies, due to the opposition of the country's authorities. He added that although many years have passed, Pascual Nadal continues to enjoy a reputation for holiness in the area where he worked.

=== After 1949 ===
Following the fall of mainland China to communism in late 1949, the local Catholic community struggled through the revolutionary turmoil. In the 1950s, the communist authorities confiscated St. Anne's church properties, namely, a small seminary (also functioning as a Latin school) and a boys' school. The former was razed to the ground and later occupied by a private company. The latter was occupied by Moxi regional government officials. On September 3, 2011, an attack took place against a nun and a priest after the parish of Moxi demanded the return of the two confiscated properties. Sister Xie Yuming was severely beaten by a group of unknown assailants and had to be hospitalized, while Father Huang Yusong suffered minor injuries. After the attack, many parishioners gathered to protest in front of St. Anne's Church and expressed their disapproval of the methods used by those who sponsored the assailants.

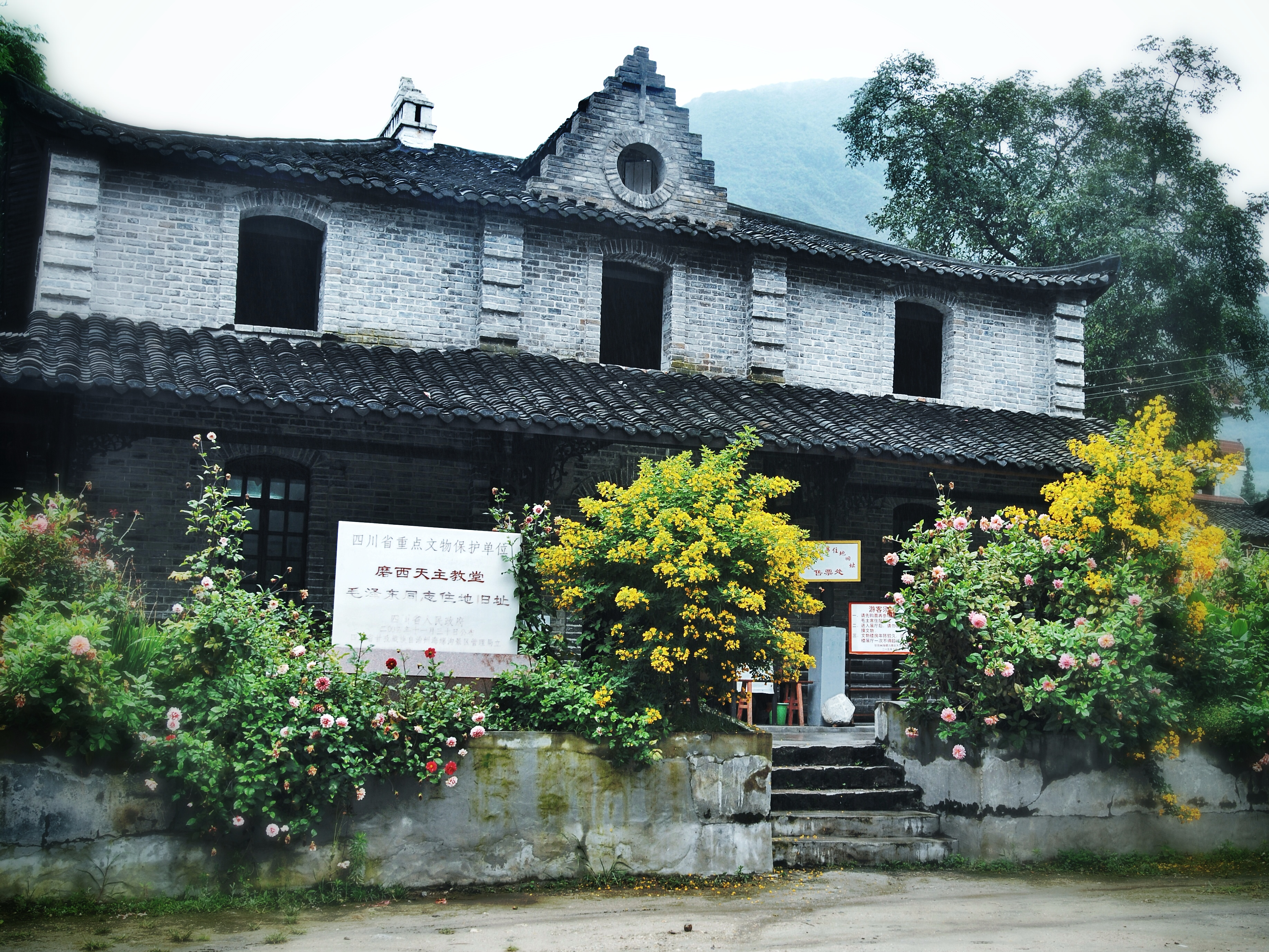
Former Franciscan residence

The 2022 Luding earthquake caused great damage to the church and the former Franciscan residence where the late chairman Mao lived in 1935, which is now designated a museum of the revolution and the Long March with a statue of Mao in front of the residence building. Damage to the buildings included deformed columns, cracks in walls, roof collapse and general structural damage. Parish priest Huang Yusong reported that repairing the buildings was expected to be very difficult. After consultation with some architects, he was told that a reconstruction plan could not be ruled out.

== Architecture ==
The church's design is influenced by local traditions and Gothic Revival style. The bell tower is topped with a local style dome, but decorated with Gothic biforas and trefoils. The interior columns have capitals decorated with carved wooden leaves. The church owns and maintains a clergy house and dormitories for male and female students attending catechism classes.

== Gallery ==
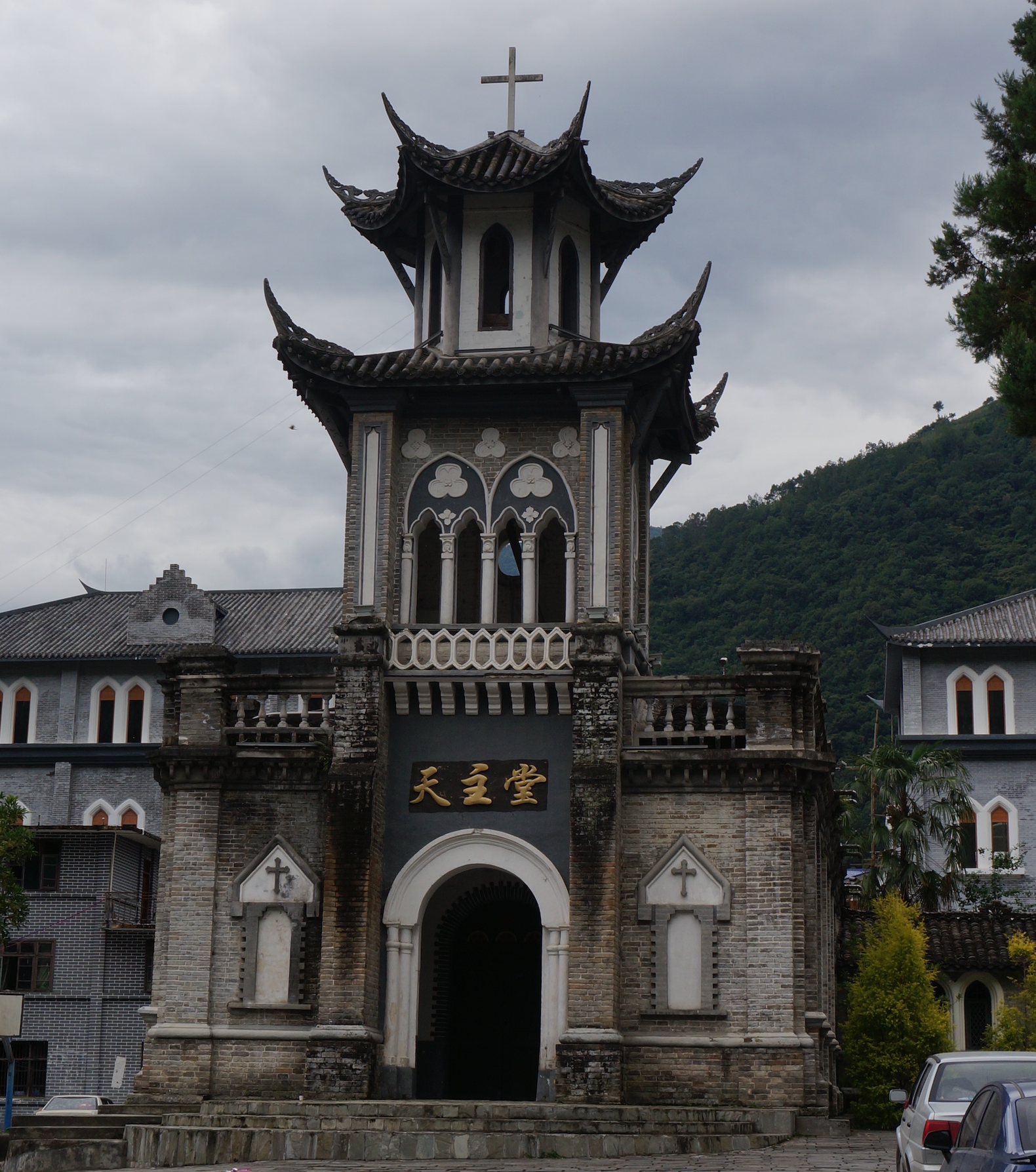
Front view

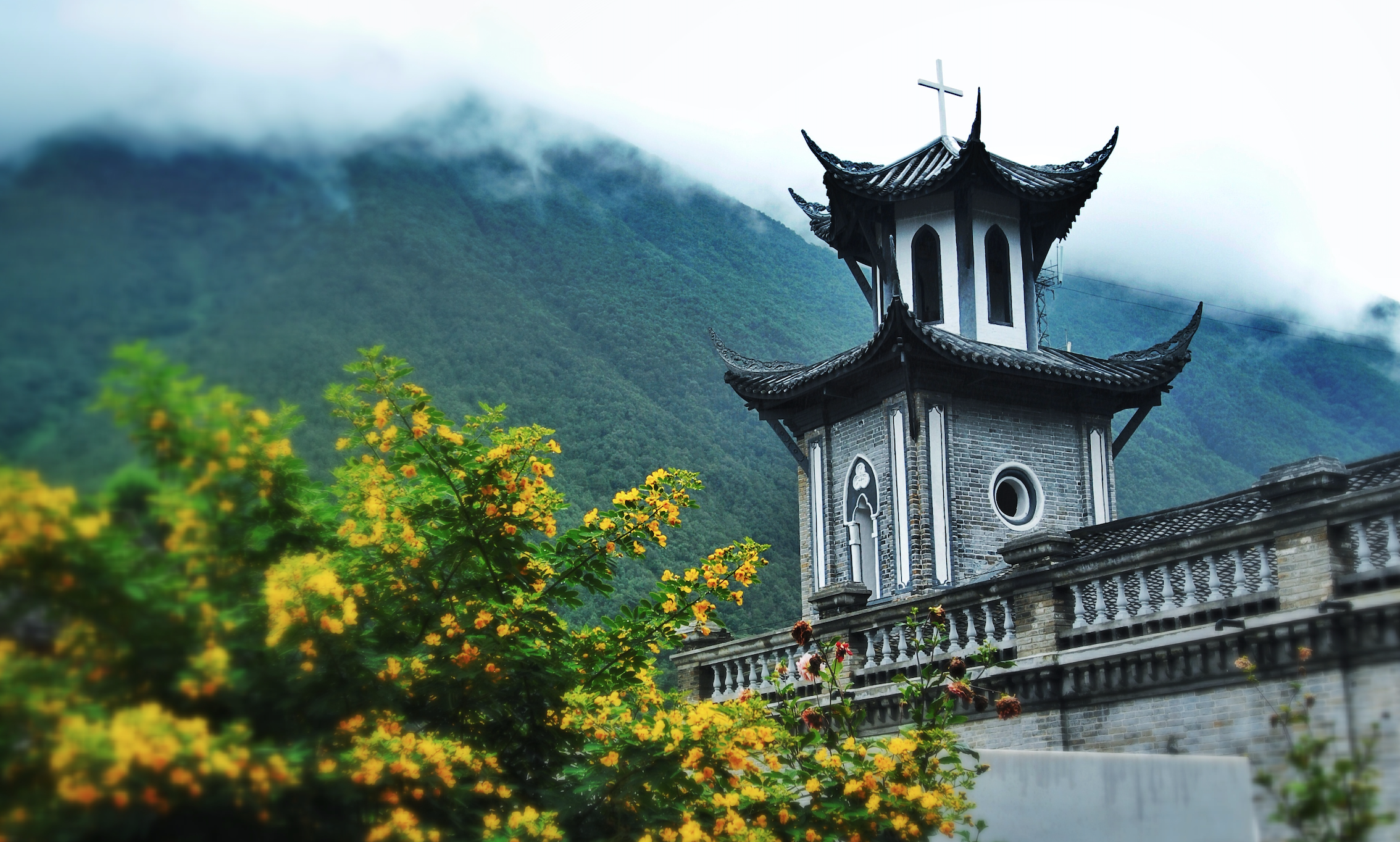
Side view

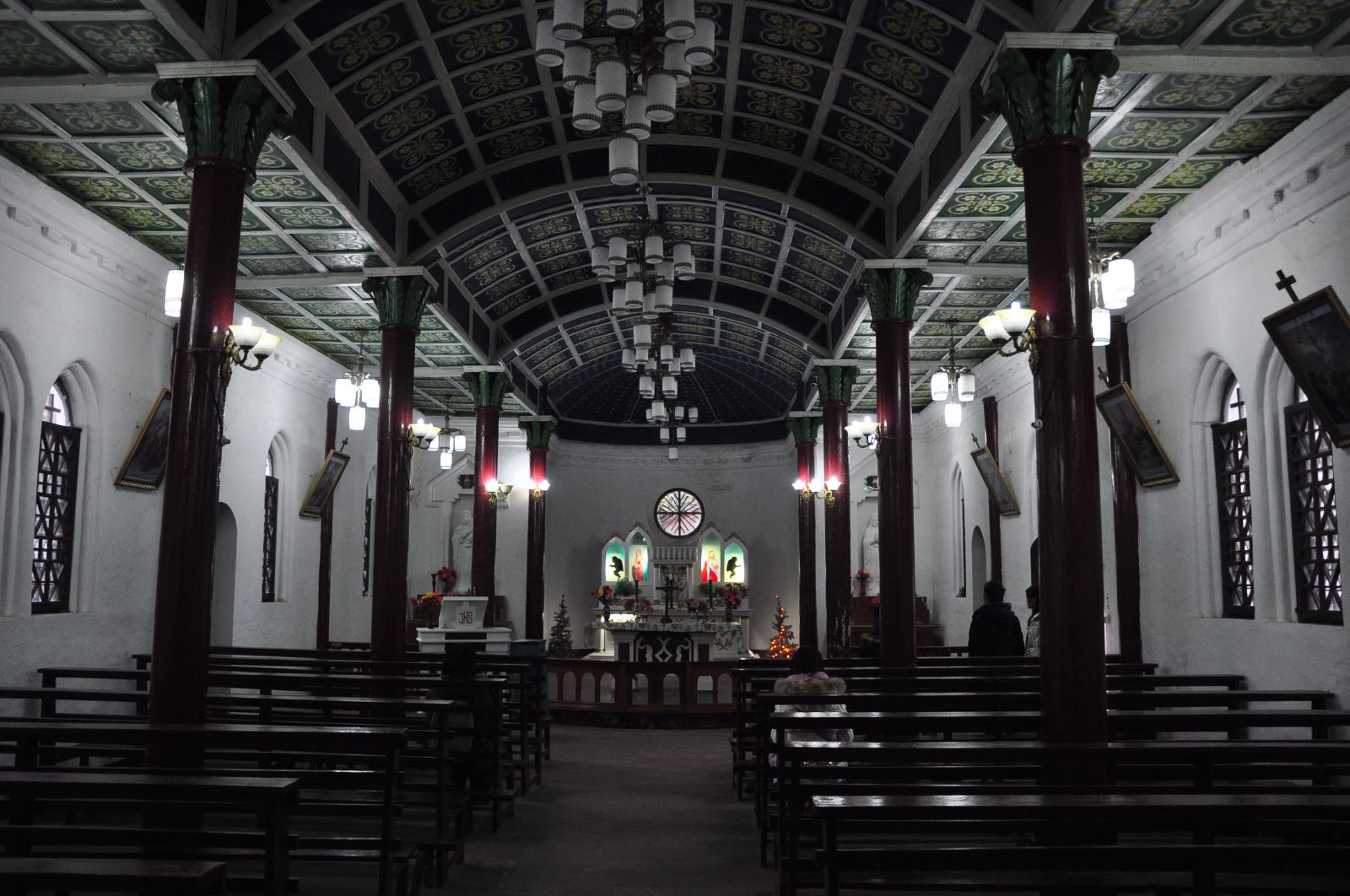
Interior

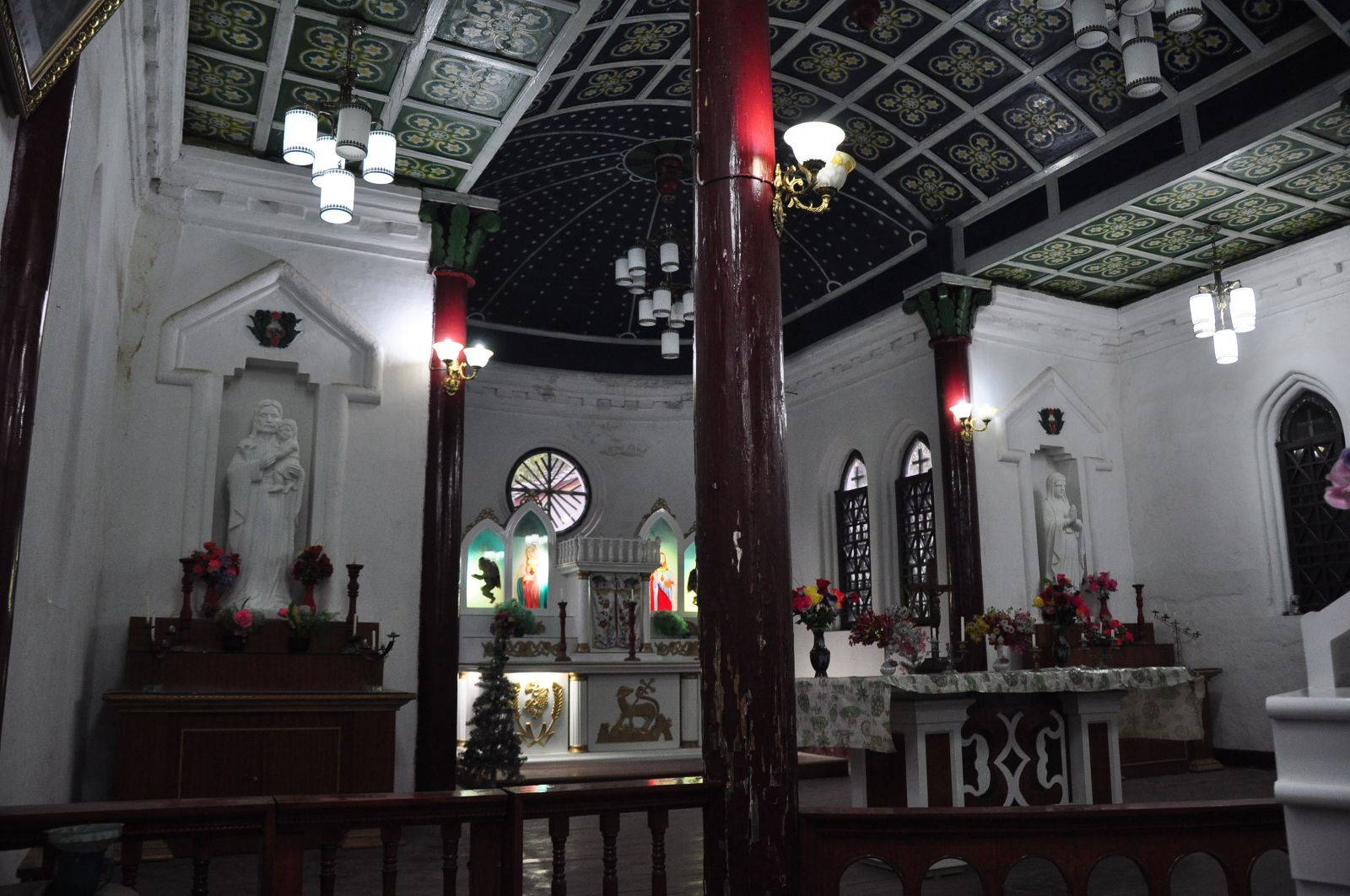
Chancel

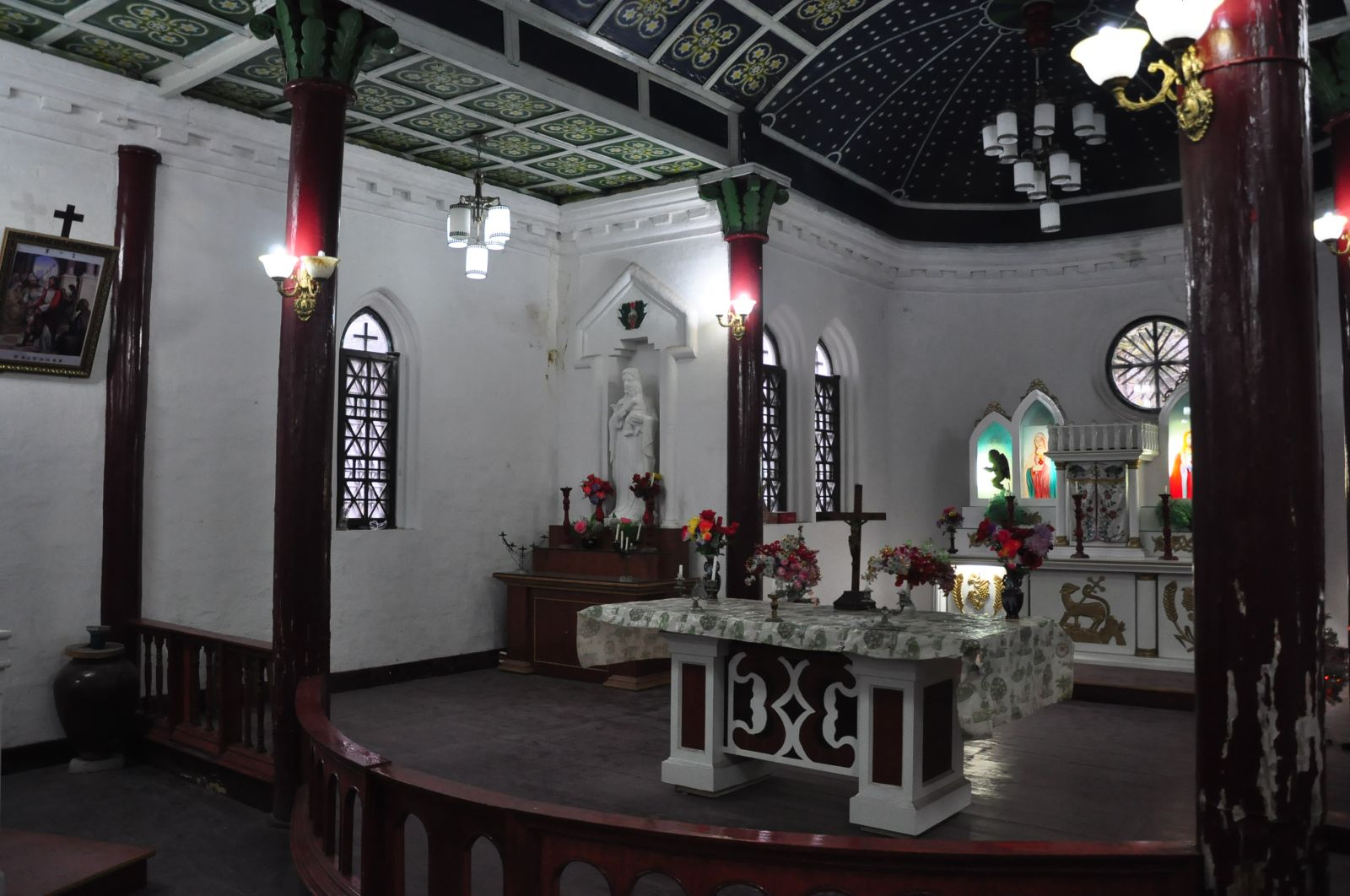
Chancel

== See also ==
- Spanish Redemptorist missions in Sichuan
- Yangliujie Catholic Church – in Sichuan's culturally close neighboring province, also occupied by communists in 1935
