= Luding County =

Luding County 泸定县 · ལྕགས་ཟམ་རྫོང་། Chagsam, Jagsam
- County
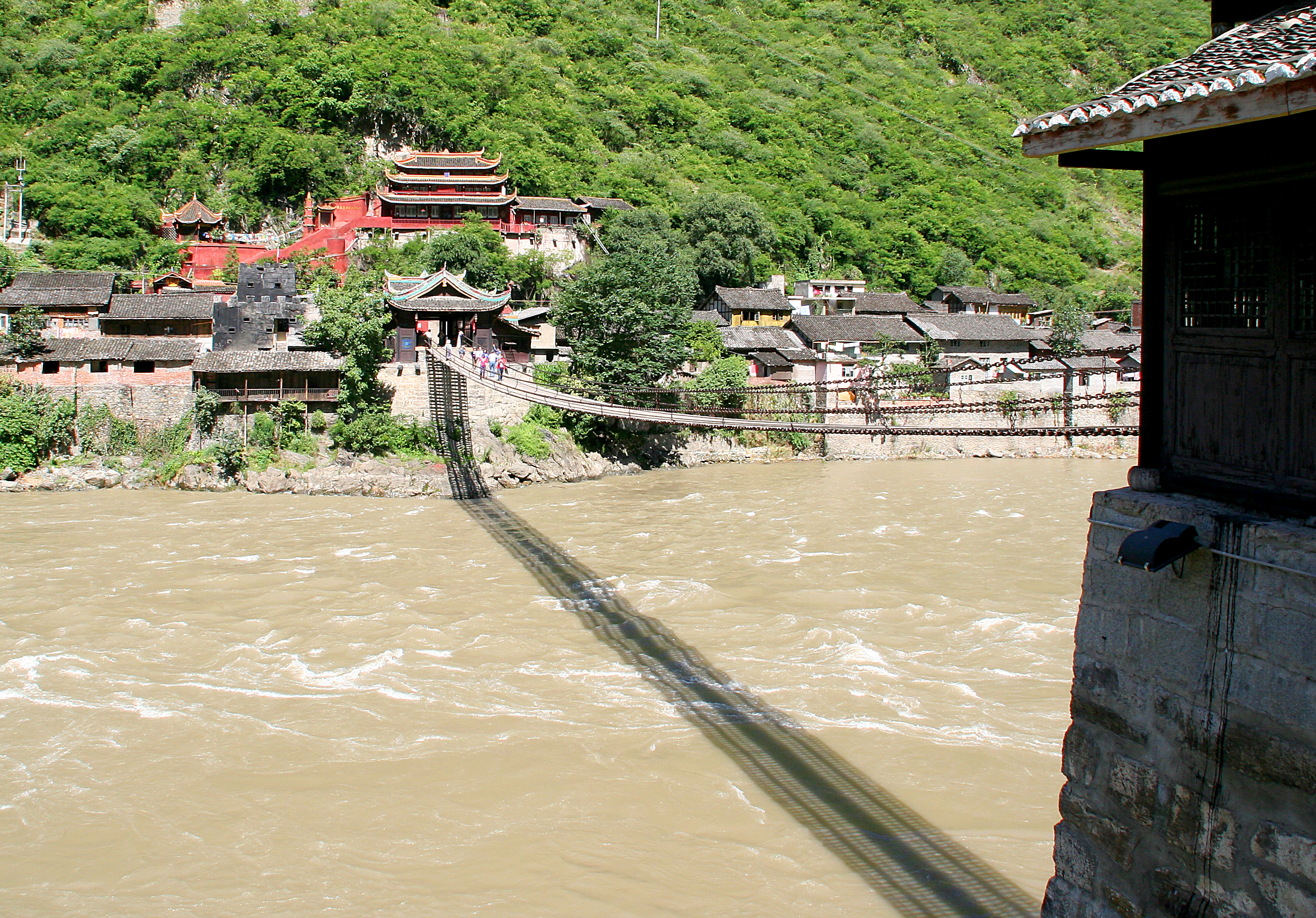
- Luding Bridge crossing the Dadu River

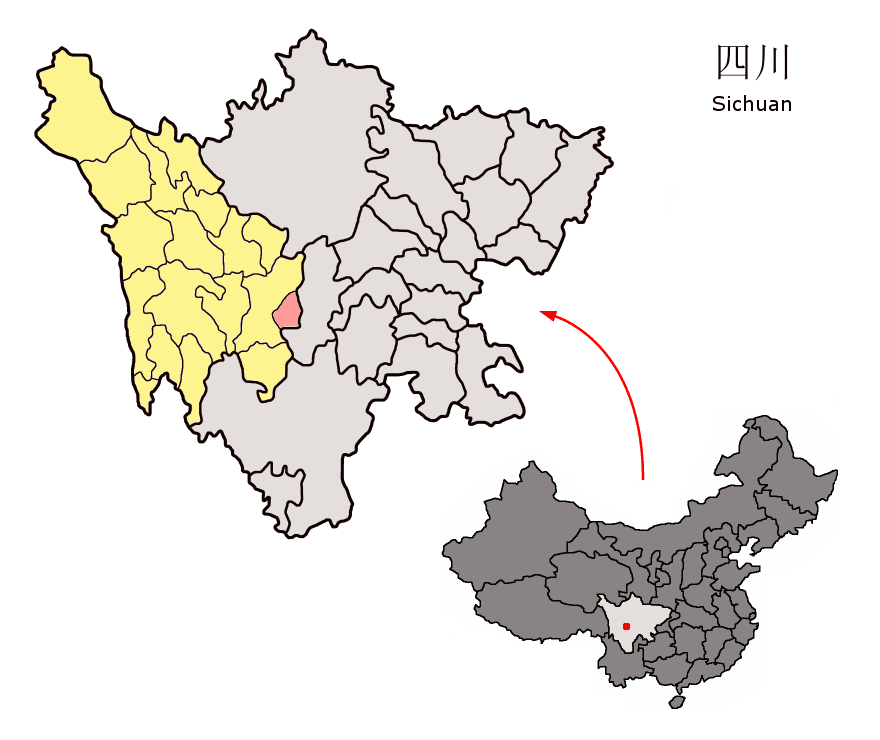
- Location of Luding County (red) within Garzê Prefecture (yellow) and Sichuan

- Location of the seat in Sichuan Luding (China)
- Coordinates: 29°54′50″N 102°14′02″E
- Country: China
- Province: Sichuan
- Prefecture-level city: Garzê
- County seat: Luqiao

Area
  - Total: 2,165.35 km^{2} (836.05 sq mi)

Population (2022)
  - Total: 86,234
  - Density: 39.825/km^{2} (103.15/sq mi)
  - Major nationalities: Han - 78.2% Tibetan - 16.0% Yi - 4.8%
- Time zone: UTC+8 (China Standard)
- Postal code: 626100
- Area code: 0836
- Website: www.luding.gov.cn

Luding County

Chinese name
- Simplified Chinese: 泸定县
- Traditional Chinese: 瀘定縣
Transcriptions
Standard Mandarin
- Hanyu Pinyin: Lúdìng Xiàn

Tibetan name
- Tibetan: ལྕགས་ཟམ་རྫོང་།
Transcriptions
- Wylie: lcags zam rdzong
- Tibetan Pinyin: Jagsam Zong

Luding County (simplified Chinese: 泸定县; traditional Chinese: 瀘定縣; pinyin: Lúdìng Xiàn), also known via its Tibetan name as Chagsam or Jagsam (Tibetan: ལྕགས་ཟམ་རྫོང་།, Wylie: lcags zam rdzong, ZWPY: Jagsam Zong), is a county located in the southeast of the Garzê Tibetan Autonomous Prefecture in Sichuan province, China. Luding County covers an area of 2,165.35 km^{2} (836.05 sq mi), and has a population of 86,234 as of 2022.

== Geography ==
Luding County is bordered by Tianquan County, Yingjing County, and Hanyuan County to the east, Shimian County to the south, and Kangding to the west and north.

The county is located within the Hengduan Mountains, within the southeastern edge of the Tibetan Plateau. The town of Luqiao, the county seat, sits at an elevation of 1,321 metres (4,334 ft) above sea level. The highest point in the county is Mount Gongga, along the southwestern border with Kangding. Mount Erlang is also located on the county's edge.

== Climate ==
Climate data for Luding, elevation 1,403 m (4,603 ft), (1991–2020 normals, extremes 1981–2010)
Month	Jan	Feb	Mar	Apr	May	Jun	Jul	Aug	Sep	Oct	Nov	Dec	Year
Record high °C (°F)	23.4 (74.1)	29.4 (84.9)	36.3 (97.3)	35.5 (95.9)	36.3 (97.3)	36.3 (97.3)	37.8 (100.0)	36.1 (97.0)	34.9 (94.8)	30.6 (87.1)	26.3 (79.3)	22.0 (71.6)	37.8 (100.0)
Mean daily maximum °C (°F)	12.2 (54.0)	15.4 (59.7)	19.2 (66.6)	24.0 (75.2)	25.9 (78.6)	26.9 (80.4)	28.7 (83.7)	28.4 (83.1)	25.6 (78.1)	21.5 (70.7)	18.0 (64.4)	13.4 (56.1)	21.6 (70.9)
Daily mean °C (°F)	6.7 (44.1)	9.4 (48.9)	12.8 (55.0)	17.0 (62.6)	19.5 (67.1)	21.1 (70.0)	22.8 (73.0)	22.5 (72.5)	20.1 (68.2)	16.4 (61.5)	12.5 (54.5)	7.9 (46.2)	15.7 (60.3)
Mean daily minimum °C (°F)	2.9 (37.2)	5.2 (41.4)	8.4 (47.1)	12.3 (54.1)	15.3 (59.5)	17.3 (63.1)	19.0 (66.2)	18.9 (66.0)	16.8 (62.2)	13.3 (55.9)	8.9 (48.0)	4.2 (39.6)	11.9 (53.4)
Record low °C (°F)	−4.2 (24.4)	−3.5 (25.7)	−2.4 (27.7)	3.4 (38.1)	6.0 (42.8)	10.6 (51.1)	13.2 (55.8)	11.7 (53.1)	9.9 (49.8)	5.3 (41.5)	0.2 (32.4)	−3.2 (26.2)	−4.2 (24.4)
Average precipitation mm (inches)	0.8 (0.03)	2.9 (0.11)	17.8 (0.70)	44.8 (1.76)	75.8 (2.98)	123.0 (4.84)	143.4 (5.65)	142.3 (5.60)	86.6 (3.41)	33.9 (1.33)	6.3 (0.25)	1.0 (0.04)	678.6 (26.7)
Average precipitation days (≥ 0.1 mm)	1.0	2.3	9.0	14.2	16.8	20.8	20.4	19.8	17.3	11.3	4.5	1.4	138.8
Average snowy days	1.4	1.0	0.3	0	0	0	0	0	0	0	0.1	0.5	3.3
Average relative humidity (%)	53	51	55	59	65	74	76	76	76	72	64	58	65
Mean monthly sunshine hours	113.9	108.3	114.2	126.1	116.8	91.1	110.1	115.7	88.0	91.4	106.9	108.5	1,291
Percentage possible sunshine	35	34	31	33	28	22	26	29	24	26	34	34	30
Source: China Meteorological Administration

Climate data for Lan'an Township (1991–2018 normals)
Month	Jan	Feb	Mar	Apr	May	Jun	Jul	Aug	Sep	Oct	Nov	Dec	Year
Mean daily maximum °C (°F)	6.9 (44.4)	9.4 (48.9)	13.3 (55.9)	17.5 (63.5)	19.8 (67.6)	20.9 (69.6)	23.1 (73.6)	22.8 (73.0)	19.4 (66.9)	15.1 (59.2)	12.0 (53.6)	8.2 (46.8)	15.7 (60.3)
Daily mean °C (°F)	1.6 (34.9)	3.9 (39.0)	7.6 (45.7)	11.9 (53.4)	14.5 (58.1)	16.4 (61.5)	18.8 (65.8)	18.3 (64.9)	15.2 (59.4)	10.9 (51.6)	6.9 (44.4)	2.9 (37.2)	10.7 (51.3)
Mean daily minimum °C (°F)	−3.7 (25.3)	−1.5 (29.3)	2.0 (35.6)	6.2 (43.2)	9.1 (48.4)	12.0 (53.6)	14.4 (57.9)	13.8 (56.8)	11.1 (52.0)	6.7 (44.1)	1.7 (35.1)	−2.3 (27.9)	5.8 (42.4)
Average precipitation mm (inches)	5.6 (0.22)	7.9 (0.31)	18.2 (0.72)	47.5 (1.87)	93.4 (3.68)	171.6 (6.76)	149.5 (5.89)	134.5 (5.30)	126.1 (4.96)	59.6 (2.35)	15.0 (0.59)	6.4 (0.25)	835.3 (32.9)
Source: Baidu

== Administrative divisions ==
As of 2022, Luding County contains the following eight towns and one township:

Name	Simplified Chinese	Hanyu Pinyin	Tibetan	Wylie	Administrative division code
Towns
Luqiao Town (Jagsam)	泸桥镇	Lúqiáo Zhèn	ལྕགས་ཟམ་གྲོང་རྡལ།	lcags zam grong rdal	513322100
Linqi Town (Lengqi)	冷碛镇	Lěngqì Zhèn	ལིན་ཆིས་གྲོང་རྡལ།	lin chis grong rdal	513322101
Xinglong Town (Xinlung)	兴隆镇	Xīnglóng Zhèn	ཞིན་ལུང་གྲོང་རྡལ།	zhin lung grong rdal	513322102
Boxab Town (Moxi)	磨西镇	Móxī Zhèn	འབོ་ཞབས་གྲོང་རྡལ།	'bo zhabs grong rdal	513322103
Kugdalung Town (Kugdalungba, Yanzigou)	燕子沟镇	Yànzigōu Zhèn	ཁུག་རྟ་ལུང་གྲོང་རྡལ།	khug rta lung grong rdal	513322104
Dêtog Town (Detuo)	得妥镇	Détuǒ Zhèn	བདེ་ཐོག་གྲོང་རྡལ།	bde thog grong rdal	513322105
Pumba Town (Pingpa, Pengba)	烹坝镇	Pēngbà Zhèn	བུམ་པ་གྲོང་རྡལ།	bum pa grong rdal	513322106
Dêwê Town (Dewei)	德威镇	Déwēi Zhèn	ཏེ་ཝེ་གྲོང་རྡལ།	te we grong rdal	513322107
Township
La'ngoi Township (Lan'an)	岚安乡	Lán'ān Xiāng	ལ་ངོས་ཤང་།	la ngos shang	513322200

== Demographics ==
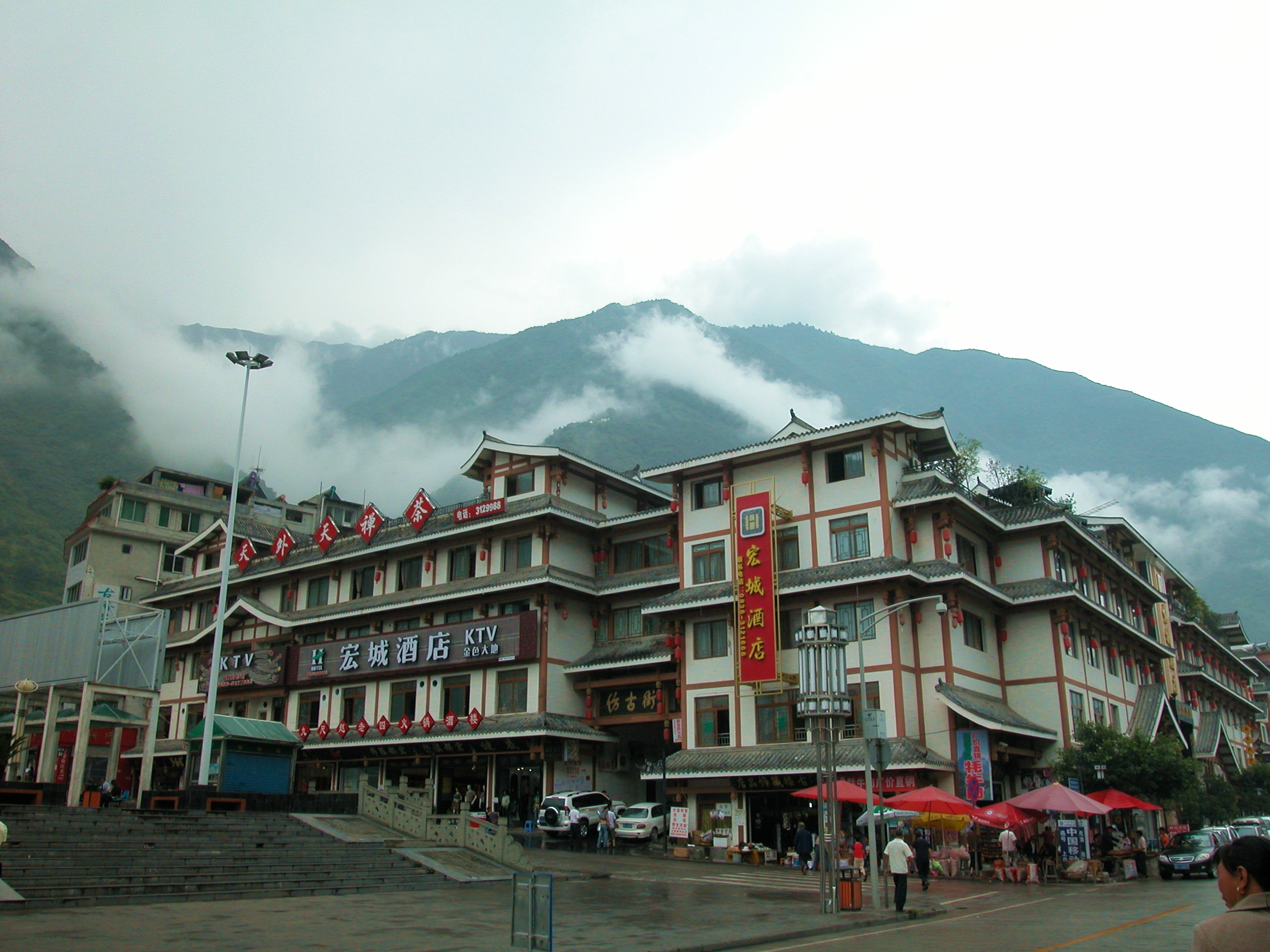
A streetscape in Luding County (2009)

Luding County has a total population of 86,234 as of 2022, up from approximately 80,000 at the end of 2004, and the 77,855 recorded in the 2000 Chinese Census.

=== Ethnic groups ===
Luding County has a supermajority Han Chinese population, but is home to a number of ethnic minorities, who constitute about 22% of the county's population. The county's ethnic minorities include Tibetans, Yi, Qiang, Miao, Hui, Mongols, Tujia, Lisu, Manchus, Yao, Kam, Nakhi, Bouyei, Bai, Zhuang, and the Dai.

The following table shows the ethnic composition of Luding County:

2000			2022
Ethnic Group	Population	Percentage	Ethnic Group	Population	Percentage
Han	66,066	84.86%	Han	~67,435	78.2%
Tibetan	7,834	10.06%	Tibetan	~13,797	16.0%
Yi	3,424	4.4%	Yi	~4,139	4.8%
Mongols	253	0.32%	Mongols	N/A	N/A
Others	278	0.36%	Others	863	1.0%

== Transport ==
- China National Highway 318
