= Luqiao (disambiguation) =

Luqiao may refer to the following places in China:

- Luqiao District (路桥区), Taizhou, Zhejiang
- Luqiao, Dingyuan County (炉桥镇), town in Dingyuan County, Anhui
- Luqiao, Weishan County, Shandong (鲁桥镇), town in Weishan County, Shandong
- Luqiao, Sichuan, town in Garze Prefecture, Sichuan
