= Hailuogou =

Glacier in China

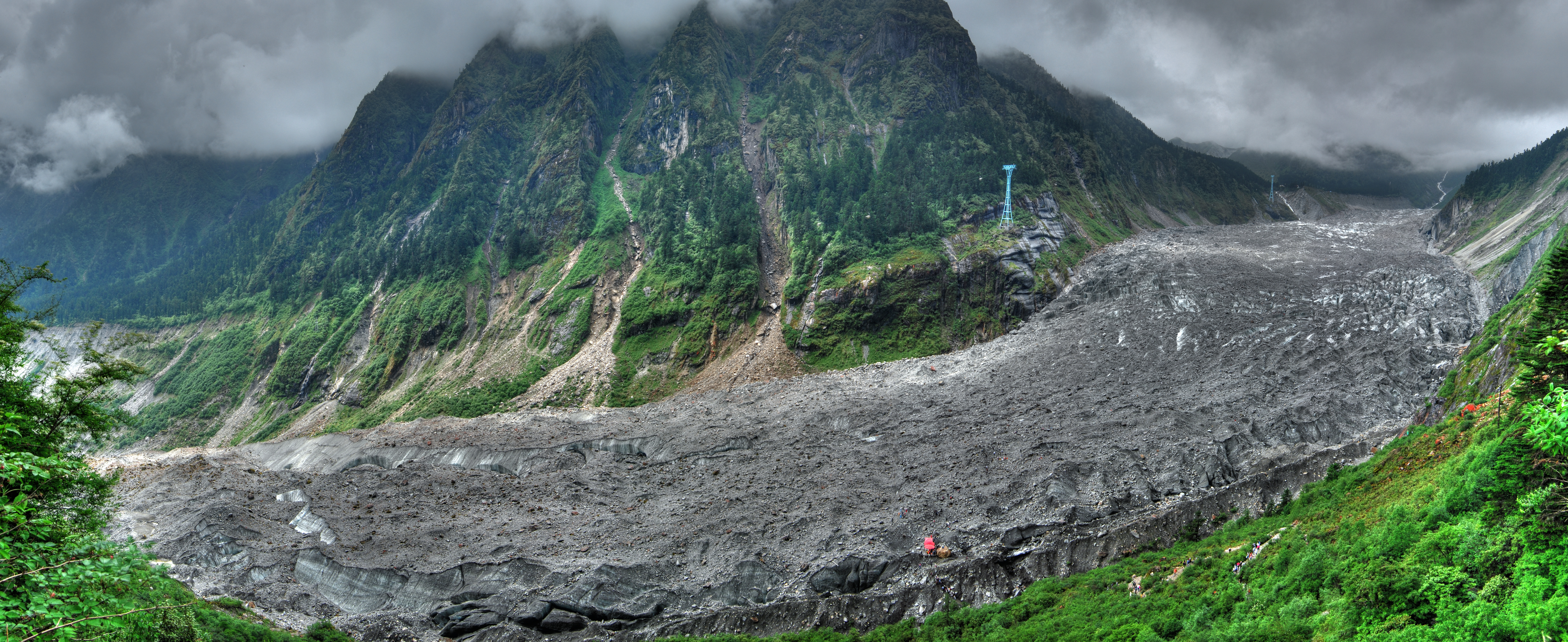
- A panorama of the Hailuogou

- Location within Sichuan
- Interactive map of Hailuogou
- Type: Mountain glacier
- Location: Daxue Mountains, Sichuan, China
- Coordinates: 29°34′01″N 101°57′00″E

Hailuogou (Chinese: 海螺沟; pinyin: Hǎiluógōu; lit. 'Sea conch ravine'; Tibetan: དུང་དཀར་ལུང་པ, Wylie: dung dkar lung pa, THL: Dungkar Lungpa) is a glacier located in Luding County, Garzê Tibetan Autonomous Prefecture, Sichuan, China. It is a feature of Hailuogou Glacier Forest Park. The glacier is next to Moxi and over 319 km (198 mi) southwest of Chengdu. It is a 5A-level (AAAAA) tourist attraction in China. It is famous for its low-altitude modern glaciers, large ice waterfalls and alpine hot springs. The glacier originates from Mount Gongga.

== History ==
In February 2017, the park was listed under the 5A-level tourist attractions list.

On September 5, 2022, a magnitude-6.8 earthquake struck Luding County, killing three park employees. An additional 219 visitors were trapped in the park for more than 50 hours before being rescued.

== Glacier ==
The glacier covers a 31 km^{2} (12 sq mi) area of Conch Gully and is characterized as a modern glacier, having formed 16 million years ago. At its most extreme, the glacier reaches a low altitude of 2,850 m (9,350 ft) above sea level and reaches a high of 6,750 m (22,150 ft), and is also about 14.7 km (9.1 mi) long. It also features the world's tallest icefall at 1,100 m (3,600 ft).

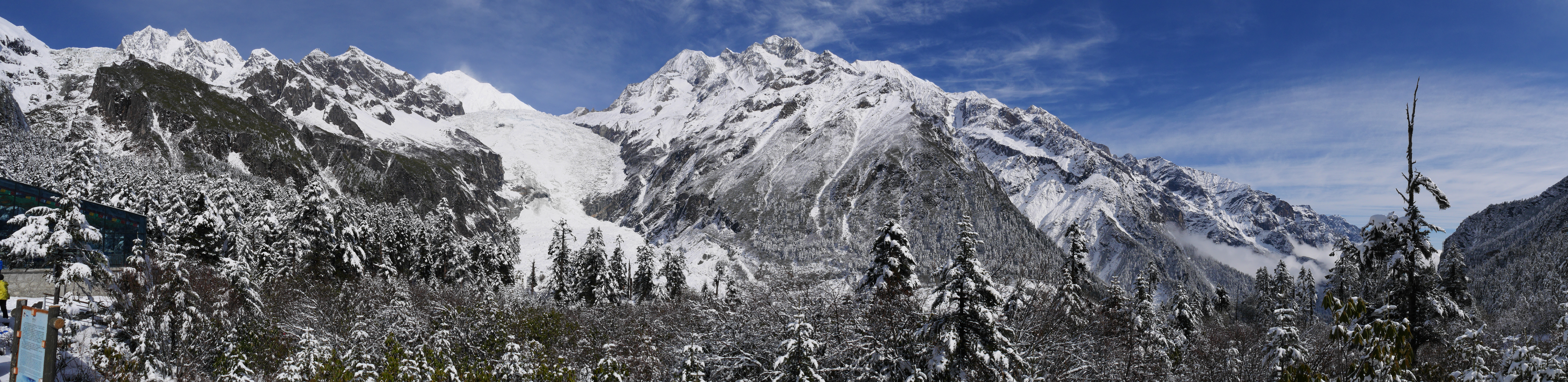
Hailuogou Glacier in 2014

== Tourist attractions ==
The park features several hot springs and "red rocks" which are rocks covered in red orange algae.
