= Tianba =

- Township

Tibetan transcription(s)

Chinese transcription(s)
  - Traditional: 田坝
- Interactive map of Tianba
- Country: China
- Province: Sichuan
- Prefecture: Garzê Tibetan Autonomous Prefecture
- Time zone: UTC+8 (CST)

Tianba (田坝乡) was a historical township in the Garzê Tibetan Autonomous Prefecture of Sichuan, China. It has a monsoon-influenced humid subtropical climate under the Köppen climate classification.

In 2019, Tianba had a total population of 5,117.

In December 2019, Tianba Township was merged into Luqiao.

== See also ==
- List of township-level divisions of Sichuan
