= Jiajun =

- Township

Tibetan transcription(s)

Chinese transcription(s)
- Interactive map of Jiajun
- Country: China
- Province: Sichuan
- Prefecture: Garzê Tibetan Autonomous Prefecture
- Time zone: UTC+8 (CST)

Jiajun (加郡乡) was a historical township in the Garzê Tibetan Autonomous Prefecture of Sichuan, China.

In 2019, Jiajun had a total population of 4,223.

In December 2019, Jiajun Township was merged into Dewei.
