= Lan'an Township =

- Township
- Lan'anxiang
- Interactive map of Lan'an Township
- Country: China
- Province: Sichuan
- Prefecture: Garzê Tibetan Autonomous Prefecture

Area
  - Total: 59.03 km^{2} (22.79 sq mi)

Population (2010)
  - Total: 2,265
  - Density: 38.37/km^{2} (99.38/sq mi)
- Time zone: UTC+8 (CST)

Lan'an Township (Chinese: 岚安乡; pinyin: Lán'ān Xiāng; Tibetan: ལ་ངོས་ཤང་།, Wylie: la ngos shang) is a township in Luding County, Garzê Tibetan Autonomous Prefecture, Sichuan, China.

In 2019, Lan'an had a total population of 2,789.
