= Niubeishan =

Niubeishan 牛背山镇
- Town
- Location in Sichuan
- Coordinates: 29°46′56″N 102°31′57″E
- Country: People's Republic of China
- Province: Sichuan
- Prefecture-level city: Ya'an
- County: Yingjing
- Village-level divisions: 4 villages
- Elevation: 1,300 m (4,300 ft)
- Time zone: UTC+8 (China Standard)
- Area code: 0835

Niubeishan (Chinese: 牛背山; pinyin: Niúbèishān) is a town in Yingjing County in western Sichuan province, China, located 29 kilometres (18 mi) west of the county seat. As of 2018, it has four villages under its administration.

Before 2017 it was known as Sanhe Township (三合乡).
