= Moxi, Luding County =

Moxi Boxab, Mosimien, Mosymien
- Town

Tibetan transcription(s)
  - Tibetan: འབོ་ཞབས་གྲོང་རྡལ།

Chinese transcription(s)
  - Simplified: 磨西镇
  - Traditional: 磨西鎮
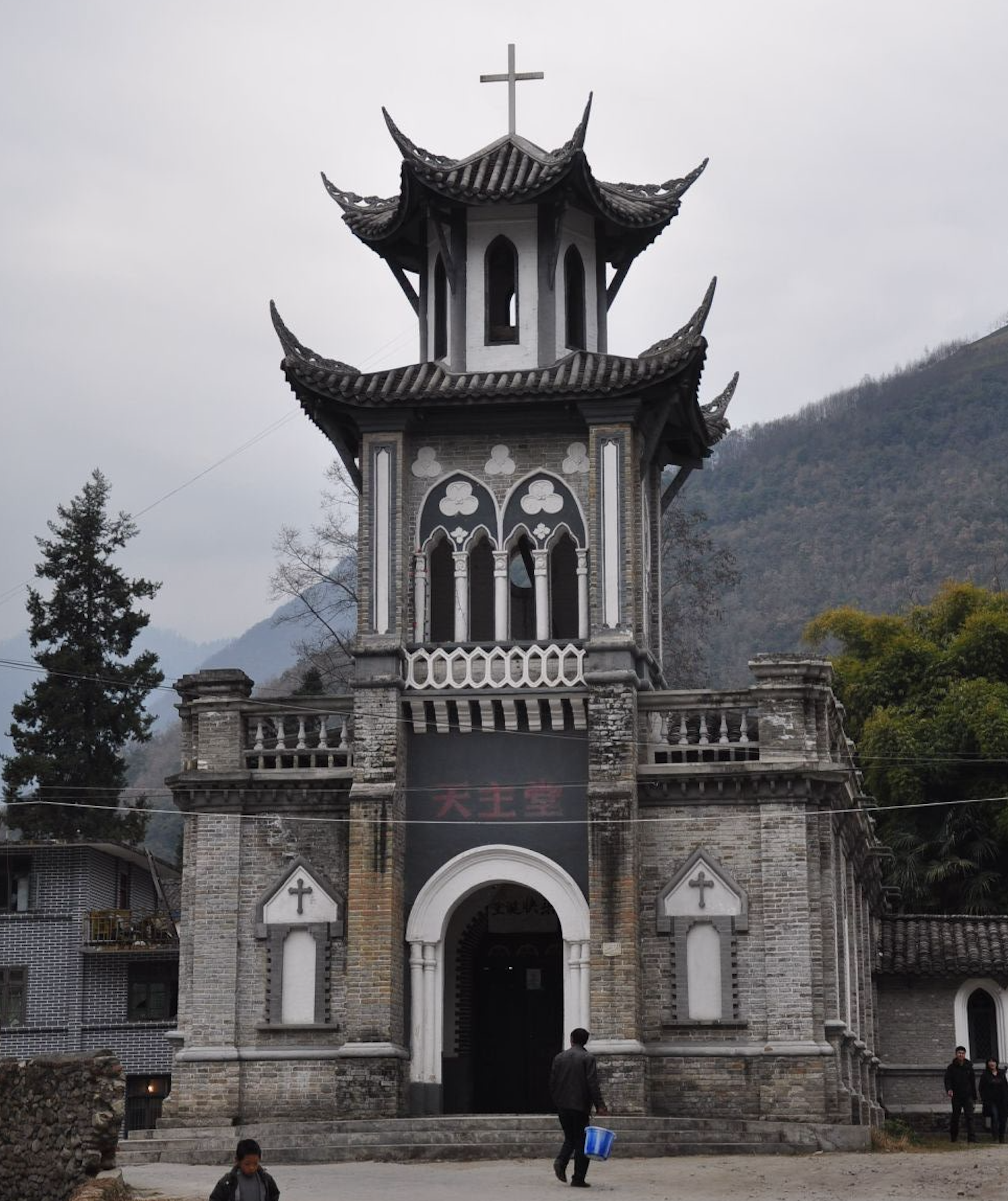
- St. Anne's Church, Moxi

- Location in Sichuan
- Coordinates: 29°40′N 102°7′E
- Country: China
- Province: Sichuan
- Autonomous Prefecture: Garzê
- County: Luding

Area
  - Total: 308.64 km^{2} (119.17 sq mi)

Population (2019)
  - Total: 7,243
  - Density: 23.47/km^{2} (60.78/sq mi)
- Time zone: UTC+8 (CST)

Moxi (simplified Chinese: 磨西镇; traditional Chinese: 磨西鎮; pinyin: Móxī Zhèn; Sichuanese romanization: Mo^{2}-si^{1} Chen^{4}; also known as Mosimien or Mosymien [磨西面]), or Boxab (Tibetan: འབོ་ཞབས་གྲོང་རྡལ།, Wylie: vbo zhabs grong rdal), is a town in Luding County in the Garzê Tibetan Autonomous Prefecture of Sichuan, China. As of 2000 it had 6,794 inhabitants. Moxi Town stands at the gateway to the Hailuogou Glacier Forest Park, south of Kangding and east of Mount Konka. The town also featured in the Battle of Luding Bridge in 1935 when some of those who fought in the battle including Mao Zedong met in Moxi and stayed the night when the army marched through before heading north.

Moxi lies at roughly 1,600 meters above sea level, and the population are mainly ethnic Han Chinese, Yi and Tibetan with other minorities.

The main crossroads at the park entrance has hotels, restaurants and souvenir stalls. About 150 metres below is the original street of the village. It has a small Catholic church built at the end of the 19th century by missionaries of the Paris Foreign Missions Society, with a colourful bell tower and a number of wooden shops. During the 1930s, European missionaries maintained a leper colony near the church, which was ransacked by communist troops in 1935. Following this event, two missionaries, Pascual Nadal Oltra and Epifanio Pegoraro, were taken prisoner and beheaded by communist soldiers.

The surrounding township is mainly pastoral land, and agriculture employs much of the population.

== History ==
On September 5, 2022, a magnitude 6.6 earthquake struck the town. At least 66 people were killed, 253 were injured, and 18 went missing. Numerous houses collapsed and landslides occurred in Moxi, where about 37 of the 66 fatalities occurred and 150 others were injured.

== See also ==
- Catholic Church in Sichuan
- Catholic Church in Tibet
