= Xinglong, Luding County =

Xinglong
- Town

Tibetan transcription(s)

Chinese transcription(s)
- Interactive map of Xinglong
- Country: China
- Province: Sichuan
- Prefecture: Garzê Tibetan Autonomous Prefecture
- Time zone: UTC+8 (CST)

Xinglong (Chinese: 兴隆镇; pinyin: Xīnglóng Zhèn; Tibetan: ཞིན་ལུང་གྲོང་རྡལ།, Wylie: zhin lung grong rdal) is a town in the Garzê Tibetan Autonomous Prefecture of Sichuan, China.

In 2019, Xinglong had a total population of 9,255.
