= Luqiao, Sichuan =

Luqiao
- Town

Tibetan transcription(s)

Chinese transcription(s)
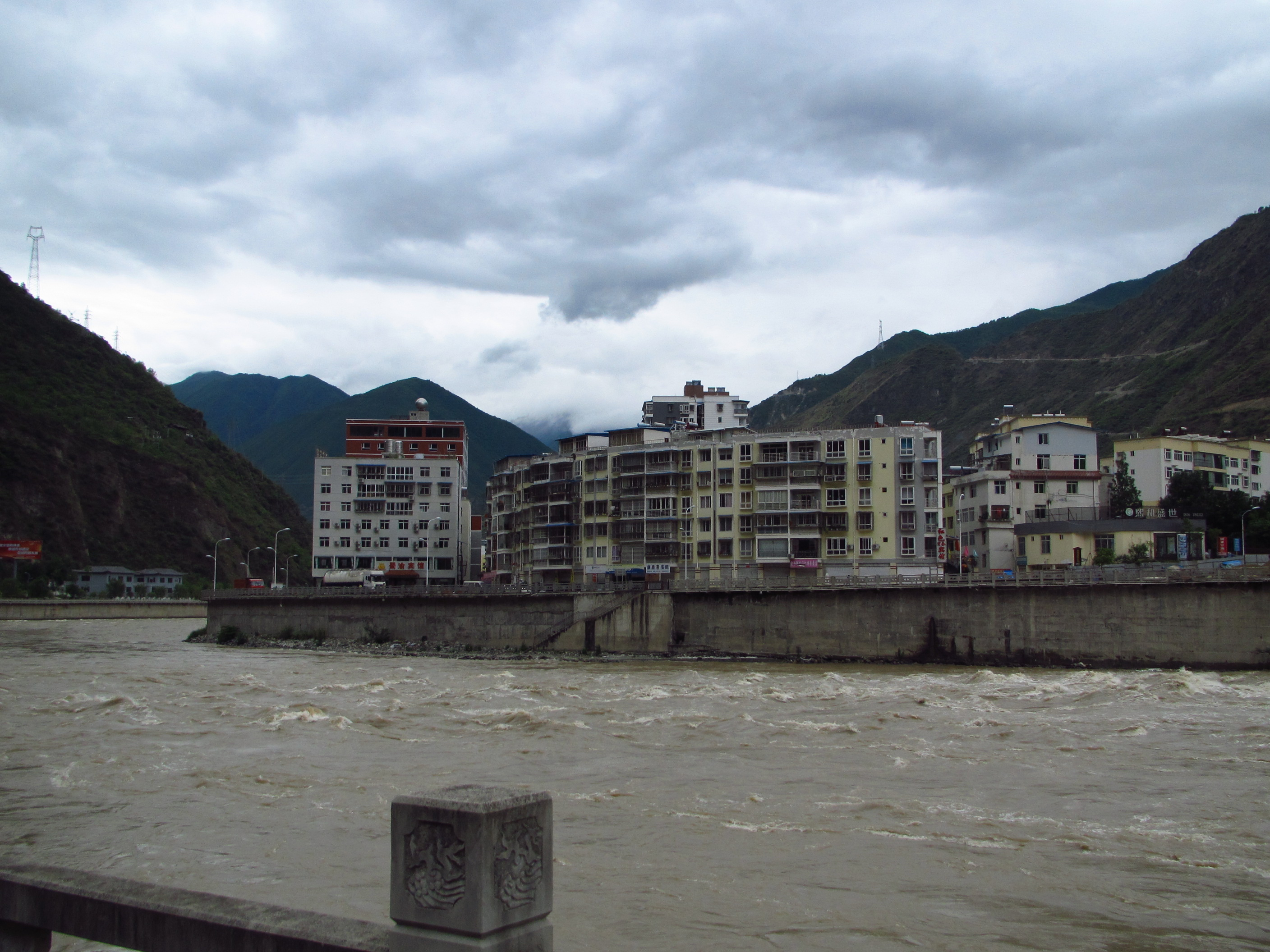
- Luqiao, Luding, on the Dadu River
- Interactive map of Luqiao
- Coordinates: 29°54′54″N 102°14′02″E
- Country: China
- Province: Sichuan
- Prefecture: Garzê Tibetan Autonomous Prefecture
- County: Luding County
- Time zone: UTC+8 (CST)

Luqiao (Chinese: 泸桥镇; pinyin: Lúqiáo Zhèn; Tibetan: ལྕགས་ཟམ་གྲོང་རྡལ།, Wylie: lcags zam grong rdal) is a town in the Garzê Tibetan Autonomous Prefecture of Sichuan, China, and forms the urban centre of Luding County. Luqiao's population is concentrated along the Dadu River at the edge of the Daxue Mountains.

In 2019, Luqiao had a total population of 23,903.

In December 2019, Tianba Township was merged into Luqiao.
