= Detuo =

- Town

Tibetan transcription(s)

Chinese transcription(s)
- Interactive map of Detuo
- Country: China
- Province: Sichuan
- Prefecture: Garzê Tibetan Autonomous Prefecture
- Time zone: UTC+8 (CST)

Detuo (Chinese: 得妥镇; pinyin: Détuǒ Zhèn; Tibetan: བདེ་ཐོག་གྲོང་རྡལ།, Wylie: bde thog grong rdal) is a town in the Garzê Tibetan Autonomous Prefecture of Sichuan, China.

In 2019, Detuo had a total population of 8,114.
