= Yanzigou =

- Town

Tibetan transcription(s)

Chinese transcription(s)
- Interactive map of Yanzigou
- Country: China
- Province: Sichuan
- Prefecture: Garzê Tibetan Autonomous Prefecture
- County: Luding County
- Time zone: UTC+8 (CST)

Yanzigou (Chinese: 燕子沟镇; pinyin: Yànzigōu Zhèn; Tibetan: ཁུག་རྟ་ལུང་གྲོང་རྡལ།, Wylie: khug rta lung grong rdal), formerly Xinxing township (Chinese: 新兴乡), is a town in Luding County in Garzê Tibetan Autonomous Prefecture of Sichuan, China.

In 2019, Xinxing had a total population of 5,400.
