= Dewei =

- Town

Tibetan transcription(s)

Chinese transcription(s)
- Interactive map of Dewei
- Country: China
- Province: Sichuan
- Prefecture: Garzê Tibetan Autonomous Prefecture
- Time zone: UTC+8 (CST)

Dewei (Chinese: 德威镇; pinyin: Déwēi Zhèn; Tibetan: ཏེ་ཝེ་གྲོང་རྡལ།, Wylie: te we grong rdal) is a town in the Garzê Tibetan Autonomous Prefecture of Sichuan, China which is only accessible through the J1 highway.

In 2019, Dewei had a total population of 4,528.

In December 2019, Jiajun Township was merged into Dewei.
