= Pengba =

- Town

Tibetan transcription(s)

Chinese transcription(s)
- Interactive map of Pengba
- Country: China
- Province: Sichuan
- Prefecture: Garzê Tibetan Autonomous Prefecture
- Time zone: UTC+8 (CST)

Pengba (Tibetan: བུམ་པ་གྲོང་རྡལ།, Wylie: bum pa grong rdal; Chinese: 烹坝镇; pinyin: Pēngbà Zhèn) is a town in the Garzê Tibetan Autonomous Prefecture of Sichuan, China.

In 2019, Pengba had a total population of 4,656.
