= Yingjing County =

Yingjing County 荥经县 • ꏐꏢꑤ
- County
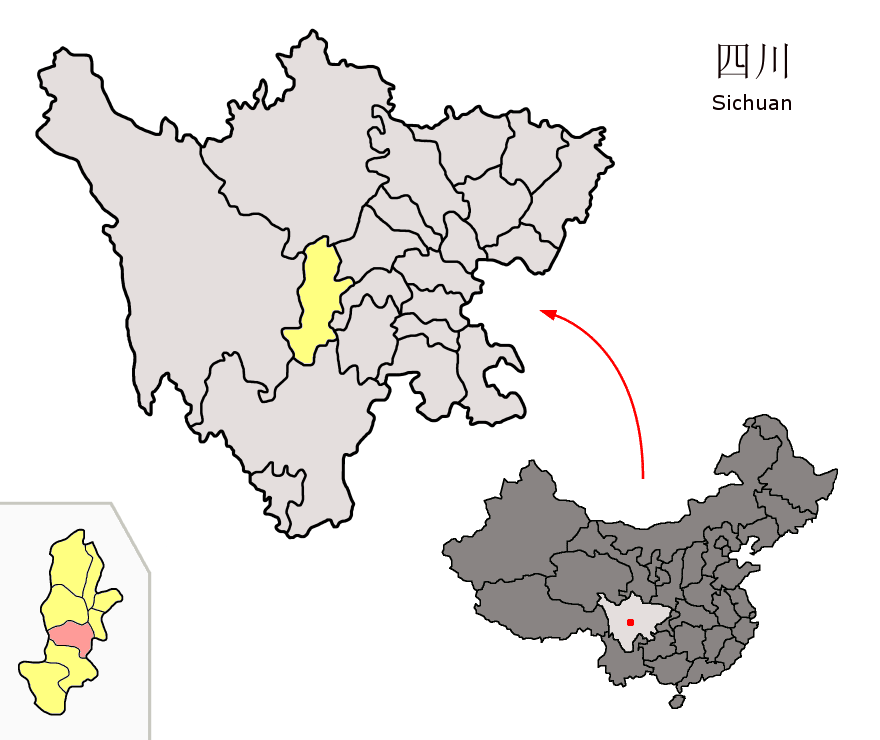
- Location of Yingjing County (red) within Ya'an City (yellow) and Sichuan
- Coordinates: 29°47′32″N 102°50′41″E
- Country: China
- Province: Sichuan
- Prefecture-level city: Ya'an
- County seat: Yandao Subdistrict

Area
  - Total: 1,781 km^{2} (688 sq mi)

Population (2020)
  - Total: 131,491
  - Density: 73.83/km^{2} (191.2/sq mi)
- Time zone: UTC+8 (China Standard)
- Postal code: 625200
- Website: www.yingjing.gov.cn

Yingjing County (simplified Chinese: 荥经县; traditional Chinese: 滎經縣; pinyin: Yíngjīng Xiàn) is a county in the west-central part of Sichuan Province, China. It is under the administration of Ya'an city.

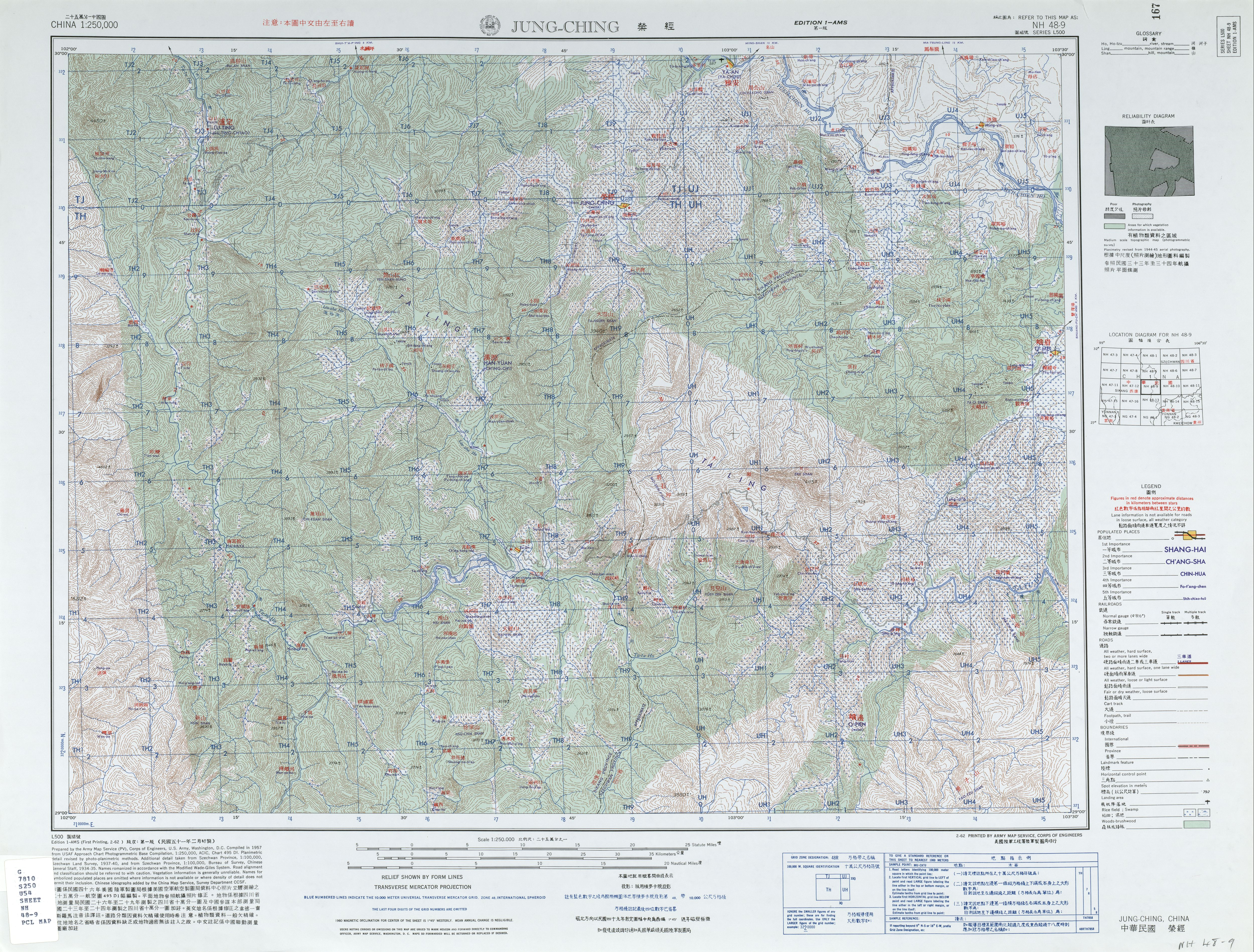
Map including Yingjing (labeled as JUNG-CHING (walled) 榮經) (AMS, 1957)

== Administrative divisions ==
Yingjing County administers 1 subdistrict, 7 towns, 2 townships and 2 ethnic townships:

- Yandao Subdistrict (严道街道)
- Huatan Town (花滩镇)
- Longcanggou Town (龙苍沟镇)
- Niubeishan Town (牛背山镇)
- Xintian Town (新添镇)
- Qinglong Town (青龙镇)
- Yinghe Town (荥河镇)
- Wuxian Town (五宪镇)
- Anjing Township (安靖乡)
- Siping Township (泗坪乡)
- Minjian Yi Ethnic Township (民建彝族乡; ꂱꏧꆈꌠꑣ mip jiep nuo su xie)
- Baofeng Yi Ethnic Township (宝峰彝族乡; ꀧꃖꆈꌠꑣ bo fo nuo su xie)

== Climate ==
Climate data for Yingjing, elevation 798 m (2,618 ft), (1991–2020 normals, extremes 1981–present)
Month	Jan	Feb	Mar	Apr	May	Jun	Jul	Aug	Sep	Oct	Nov	Dec	Year
Record high °C (°F)	19.0 (66.2)	22.0 (71.6)	30.7 (87.3)	31.9 (89.4)	34.6 (94.3)	34.9 (94.8)	37.6 (99.7)	37.4 (99.3)	34.4 (93.9)	28.5 (83.3)	24.3 (75.7)	19.3 (66.7)	37.6 (99.7)
Mean daily maximum °C (°F)	9.0 (48.2)	11.6 (52.9)	16.3 (61.3)	21.9 (71.4)	25.3 (77.5)	27.6 (81.7)	29.4 (84.9)	29.3 (84.7)	24.9 (76.8)	20.0 (68.0)	15.7 (60.3)	10.4 (50.7)	20.1 (68.2)
Daily mean °C (°F)	5.5 (41.9)	7.7 (45.9)	11.4 (52.5)	16.2 (61.2)	19.7 (67.5)	22.3 (72.1)	24.1 (75.4)	23.9 (75.0)	20.5 (68.9)	16.4 (61.5)	12.1 (53.8)	7.1 (44.8)	15.6 (60.0)
Mean daily minimum °C (°F)	3.2 (37.8)	4.9 (40.8)	7.9 (46.2)	12.1 (53.8)	15.8 (60.4)	18.9 (66.0)	20.7 (69.3)	20.5 (68.9)	17.9 (64.2)	14.1 (57.4)	9.9 (49.8)	4.9 (40.8)	12.6 (54.6)
Record low °C (°F)	−4.4 (24.1)	−2.1 (28.2)	−1.6 (29.1)	2.3 (36.1)	6.5 (43.7)	11.6 (52.9)	14.3 (57.7)	14.0 (57.2)	10.6 (51.1)	4.4 (39.9)	−0.2 (31.6)	−5.5 (22.1)	−5.5 (22.1)
Average precipitation mm (inches)	6.1 (0.24)	11.1 (0.44)	34.2 (1.35)	73.5 (2.89)	103.8 (4.09)	152.2 (5.99)	245.5 (9.67)	307.4 (12.10)	134.4 (5.29)	62.6 (2.46)	21.2 (0.83)	6.3 (0.25)	1,158.3 (45.6)
Average precipitation days (≥ 0.1 mm)	8.1	9.6	14.2	15.9	18.0	20.4	19.9	18.7	20.4	20.8	12.6	7.6	186.2
Average snowy days	2.2	0.8	0	0	0	0	0	0	0	0	0	0.5	3.5
Average relative humidity (%)	79	79	78	77	77	79	82	82	84	84	82	81	80
Mean monthly sunshine hours	38.4	44.0	70.7	96.5	92.6	83.7	109.6	122.8	55.3	42.2	45.4	40.1	841.3
Percentage possible sunshine	12	14	19	25	22	20	26	30	15	12	14	13	19
Source: China Meteorological Administration all-time extreme temperature August all time high all-time January high
