= Tretes =

- Tourist Village
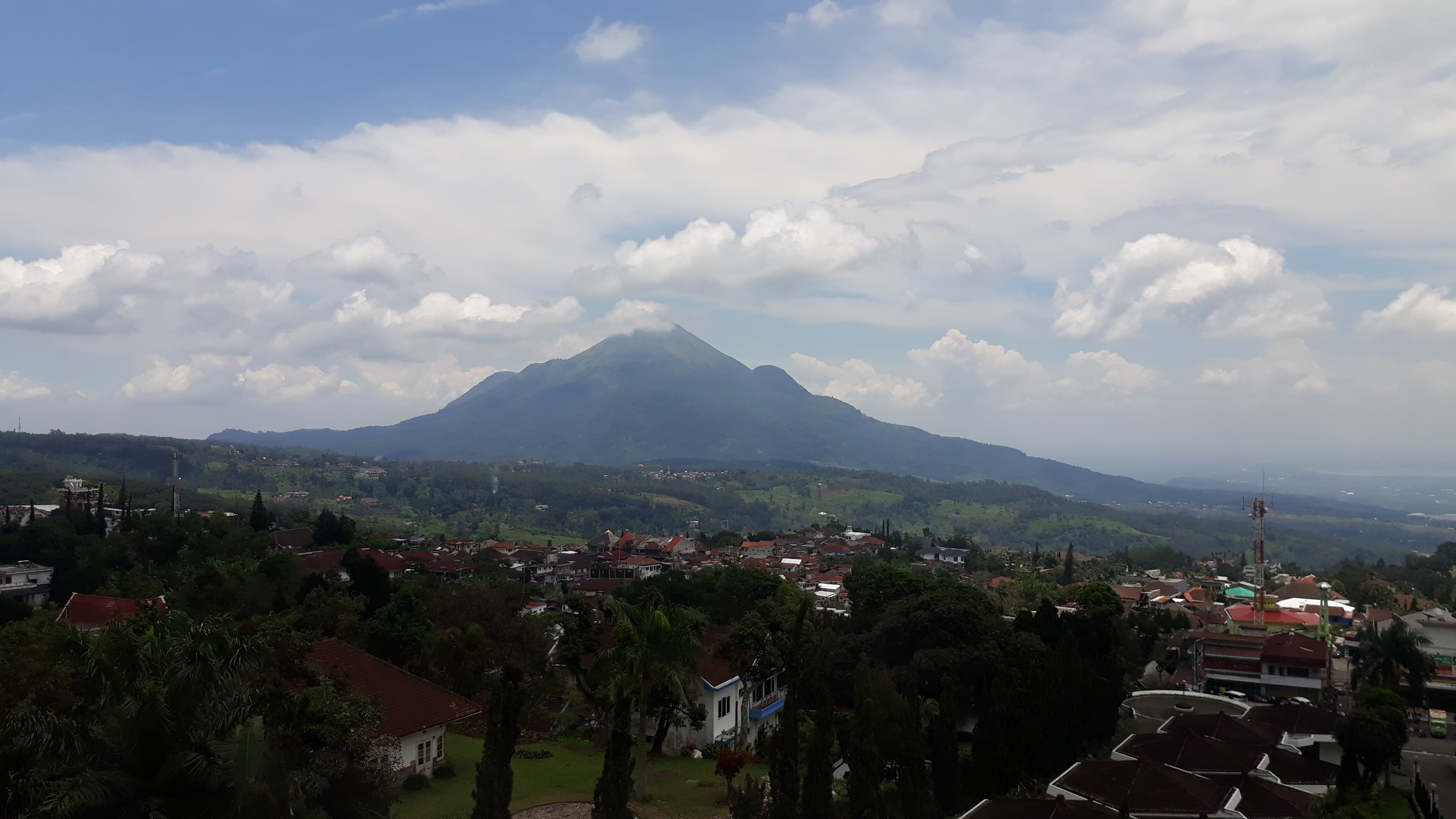
- View of Tretes and Mount Penanggungan

- Location of Tretes Tretes (Indonesia)
- Coordinates: 7°40′32″S 112°36′18″E
- Country: Indonesia
- Region: Java
- Province: East Java
- Regency: Pasuruan Regency
- District: Prigen
- Elevation: 854 m (2,802 ft)
- Time zone: UTC+7 (WIB)
- Website: Official Website of Tretes

Tretes is a mountain tourist area in East Java, Indonesia. This area is located 60 km south of Surabaya, the capital city of East Java, and its administrative is part of Prigen, Pasuruan Regency. Tretes area is located on the slopes mountain of Arjuno-Welirang. The area is a popular area for tourism. This area is located at an altitude of 600–900 meters above sea level.

== Etymology ==
The word of Tretes comes from the water dripping sounds like "tes" "tes". This can be seen by the presence of a source of water dripping in the cracks of the stone walls in the Dong Biru area (located near the area of Kakek Bodo tourist attractions and from the direction of Surabaya located on the right side of the main road).

== History ==
Since a long time ago the Tretes was known as one of the main rest areas in Java because of its natural scenic and cool air. Tretes was once known as the rest area of the Dutch colonial people. In this area, there are many Dutch heritage buildings. Usually in the form of a European-style wooden house, which at this time the number began to decrease due to poorly maintained. Many of the villa's buildings have been demolished. Some of the building's names are Dong De (Gedung Gede), Dong Koco (Glass Building), Dong Ijo, Dong Biru, Eskam (currently Surya Hotel). There is not much history of Tretes that can be known, one of the places that is a silent witness to history is the existence of ancient tombs in Gang Kramat 77 Pesanggrahan which is a tomb from the forerunner of the population of Tretes.

== Geography ==
Tretes is on the slopes of several mountains and is at an average altitude of 600-900 meters above sea level with air temperatures reaching an average of 18-22 degrees Celsius. Tretes is surrounded by several mountains, including:

- Mount Arjuno-Welirang
- Mount Anjasmoro
- Mount Penanggungan

=== Climate ===
The climate is tropical monsoon (Am) in Tretes, bordering with subtropical highland climate (Cwb) according to the Köppen-Geiger climate classification. Rainfall is significant most months of the year, and the short dry season has little effect. The average temperature in Tretes is 21.7 °C. In a year, the average rainfall is 3176 mm.

Climate data for Tretes, Prigen, Pasuruan Regency (elevation 854 m or 2,802 ft)
Month	Jan	Feb	Mar	Apr	May	Jun	Jul	Aug	Sep	Oct	Nov	Dec	Year
Mean daily maximum °C (°F)	26 (79)	26.1 (79.0)	26.1 (79.0)	26.4 (79.5)	26.6 (79.9)	26.4 (79.5)	25.9 (78.6)	26.6 (79.9)	27.3 (81.1)	27.8 (82.0)	27.1 (80.8)	26.1 (79.0)	26.5 (79.8)
Daily mean °C (°F)	22 (72)	22 (72)	22 (72)	22 (72)	22 (72)	21.5 (70.7)	20.7 (69.3)	21.1 (70.0)	21.8 (71.2)	22.5 (72.5)	21.4 (70.5)	21.8 (71.2)	21.7 (71.3)
Mean daily minimum °C (°F)	18 (64)	17.9 (64.2)	17.9 (64.2)	17.7 (63.9)	17.4 (63.3)	16.6 (61.9)	15.5 (59.9)	15.7 (60.3)	16.3 (61.3)	17.3 (63.1)	17.8 (64.0)	17.6 (63.7)	17.1 (62.8)
Average precipitation mm (inches)	544 (21.4)	466 (18.3)	478 (18.8)	289 (11.4)	208 (8.2)	97 (3.8)	82 (3.2)	45 (1.8)	69 (2.7)	146 (5.7)	307 (12.1)	445 (17.5)	3,176 (124.9)
Average relative humidity (%)	81.2	81.2	81.4	79.8	80.8	78.7	77.4	75.4	73.6	72.9	76.5	79.9	78.2
Source 1: Climate-Data.org (temp & precip)
Source 2: Weatherbase (humidity)

== Panorama ==
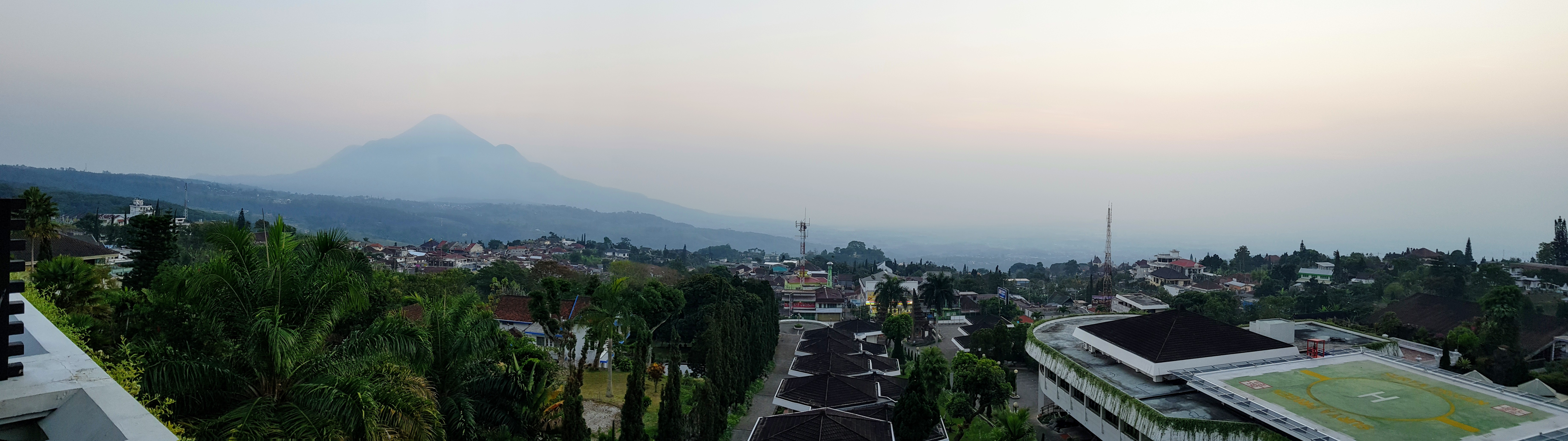
Panorama of Tretes and Mount Penanggungan from Surya Hotel & Cottages

== Tourism ==
There is many tourism place in Tretes, for example is:

- Alap-Alap Waterfall
- Kakek Bodo Waterfall
- Putuk Truno Waterfall
- Tretes Market

=== Notably Hotels and Villas ===
At Tretes there are many villa and hotel, for example:

- Surya Hotel
- Inna Tretes
- Pines Garden
- Tanjung Plaza Hotel
- Royal Senyiur Hotel

== See also ==
- Prigen
- Mount Penanggungan
- Arjuno-Welirang
