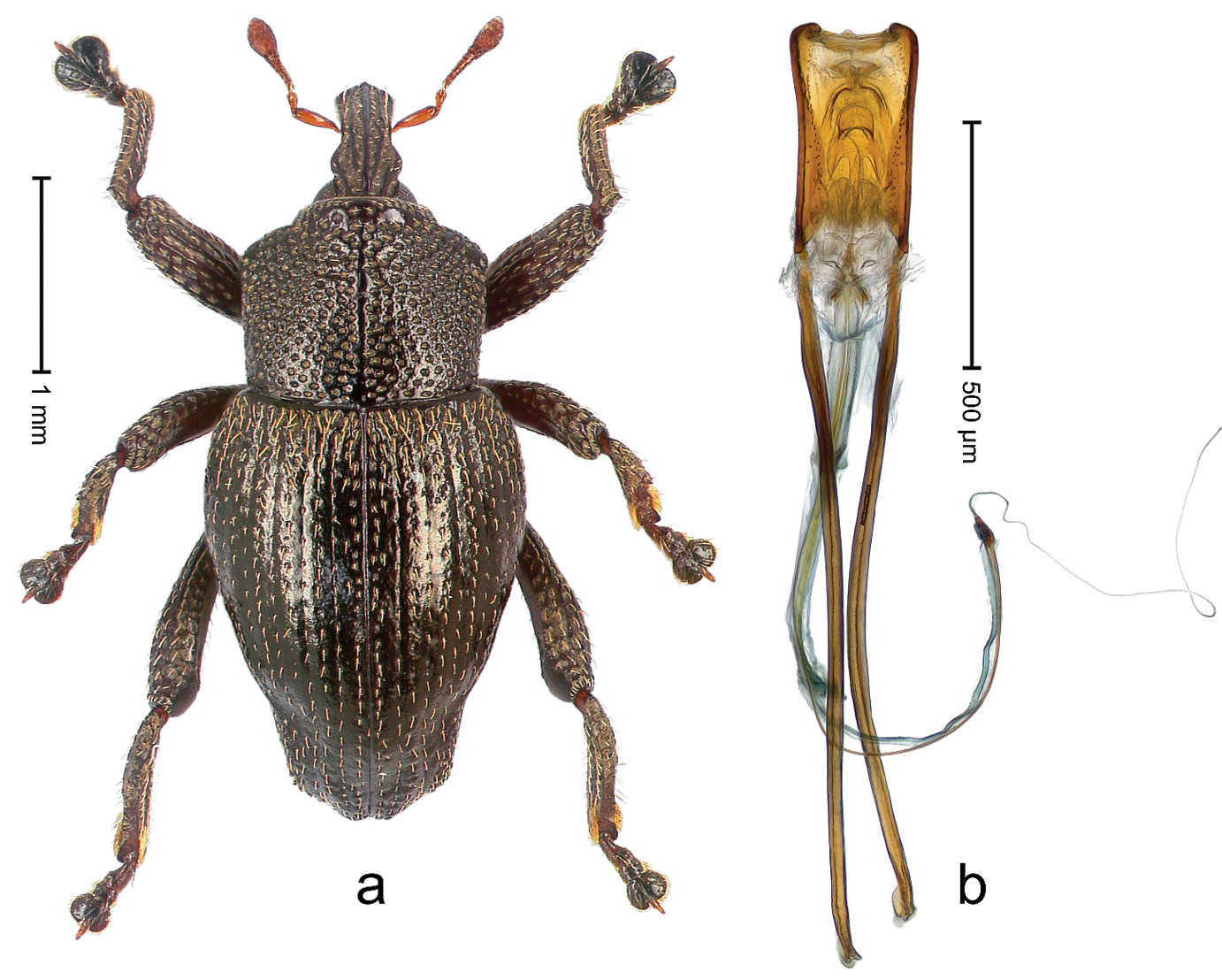

Scientific classification
- Kingdom: Animalia
- Phylum: Arthropoda
- Clade: Pancrustacea
- Class: Insecta
- Order: Coleoptera
- Suborder: Polyphaga
- Infraorder: Cucujiformia
- Family: Curculionidae
- Genus: Trigonopterus
- Species: T. arjunensis

Binomial name
- Trigonopterus arjunensis Riedel, 2014

= Trigonopterus arjunensis =

Species of beetle

Trigonopterus arjunensis is a species of flightless weevil in the genus Trigonopterus from Indonesia. The species was described in 2014. The beetle is 3.09–3.34 mm long. It has reddish-brown legs and antennae with a black body and tarsi. Endemic to East Java, where it is known from Mount Arjuno and Mount Wilis at elevations of 1,388–1,432 m (4,554–4,698 ft).

== Taxonomy ==
Trigonopterus arjunensis was described by the entomologist Alexander Riedel in 2014 on the basis of an adult male specimen collected from Mount Arjuno on the island of Java in Indonesia. It is named after the mountain on which it was discovered.

== Description ==
The beetle is 3.09–3.34 mm long. It has reddish-brown legs and antennae with a black body and tarsi. The body is elongated, with a pronounced constriction between the pronotum and elytron when viewed from above. In profile, the body is flat along most of its length and slightly convex at the tip. The rostrum has a median and a pair of submedian ridges, with the grooves between them each containing a sparse row of erect piliform scales. The epistome is simple.

The pronotum widens toward the front, with the sides projecting at a slight angle and a faint narrowing near the tip. The surface is coarsely punctured, with finely textured interspaces. Each puncture contains a flat piliform scale directed outward. A median ridge is present. The elytra have indistinct striae, marked by fine lines and rows of small punctures. The intervals are flat and microreticulate, each with a row of small punctures and sparse, recumbent piliform scales, which are more noticeable along the base. In the apical third, interval 7 forms a sharp lateral edge. The sutural interval is slightly swollen at the apex, which is subangulate and has a shallow notch at the suture.

The femora are edentate, with a crenulate ridge on the underside. The metafemur has a subapical stridulatory patch. The dorsal edge of the tibiae has an angled projection near the base, and the mesotibia has this angulation extended into a sharp tooth. The third tarsomere of the protarsus is slightly larger than that of the mesotarsus. Abdominal ventrite 5 is flat, coarsely punctured at the tip, and sparsely setose.

The penis has slightly diverging sides and a pointed apex. The transfer apparatus is flagelliform and four times the length of the penis body. The apodemes are 3.1 times as long. The ductus ejaculatorius lacks a bulbus.

Females are more slender than males. Males have a duller body surface, while females have smaller, sparser punctures and polished interspaces. In some specimens, the recumbent piliform scales are very small and sparse, and nearly absent in females. The female rostrum has glabrous median and submedian costae.

== Distribution ==
Trigonopterus arjunensis is endemic to the Indonesian province of East Java, where it is known from Mount Arjuno and Mount Wilis. It has been recorded from elevations of 1,388–1,432 m (4,554–4,698 ft).
