= Jawi Temple =

Hindu-Buddhist temple in Prigen, East Java, Indonesia

Coordinates: 7°39′45″S 112°40′11″E

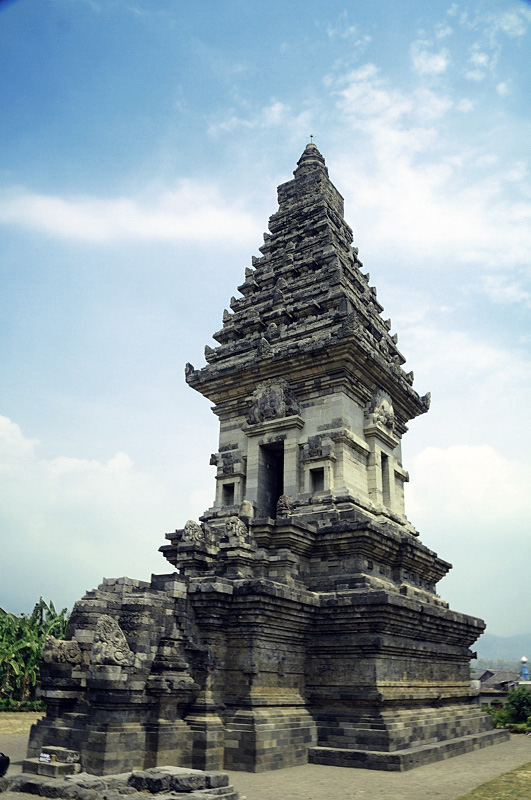
Candi Jawi in Prigen, Pasuruan, East Java, the base is made of black stones, while the upper parts are made from white stones.

Jawi temple (Indonesian: Candi Jawi, original name: Jajawa) is a syncretic Hindu-Buddhist candi (temple) dated from the late 13th century Singhasari kingdom. The temple is located on the eastern slope of Mount Welirang, Candi Wates village, Kecamatan Prigen, Pasuruan, East Java, Indonesia, approximately 31 kilometers west of Pasuruan city or 41 kilometers south of Surabaya. The temple is located on the main road between Kecamatan Pandaan – Kecamatan Prigen and Pringebukan. The temple was thought to be a Hindu-Buddhist place of worship, however, the temple was dedicated as a mortuary temple to honor King Kertanegara, the last king of Singhasari. It is believed that the ashes of the late king were also placed in two more temples, the Singhasari temple and the Jago temple.

The Nagarakretagama canto 56 mentioned this temple as Jajawa. King Kertanegara of Singhasari ordered the construction of this temple to provide a place of worship for the adherents of Shiva-Buddha sect, a syncretic religion patronage by the king.

== Architecture ==
The temple compound measured 40 x 60 square meters, enclosed within 2 meters high red brick wall. The temple is surrounded by a moat filled with flowering lotus plants. The temple measures 24.5 meters high with the base of the structure measured 14.2 x 9.5 meters. The temple structure is tall and slender with the tall receding towering roof crowned with the combination pinnacle of cube and stupa. The door of the main cella and the main stairs face east.

== Nagarakretagama descriptions ==
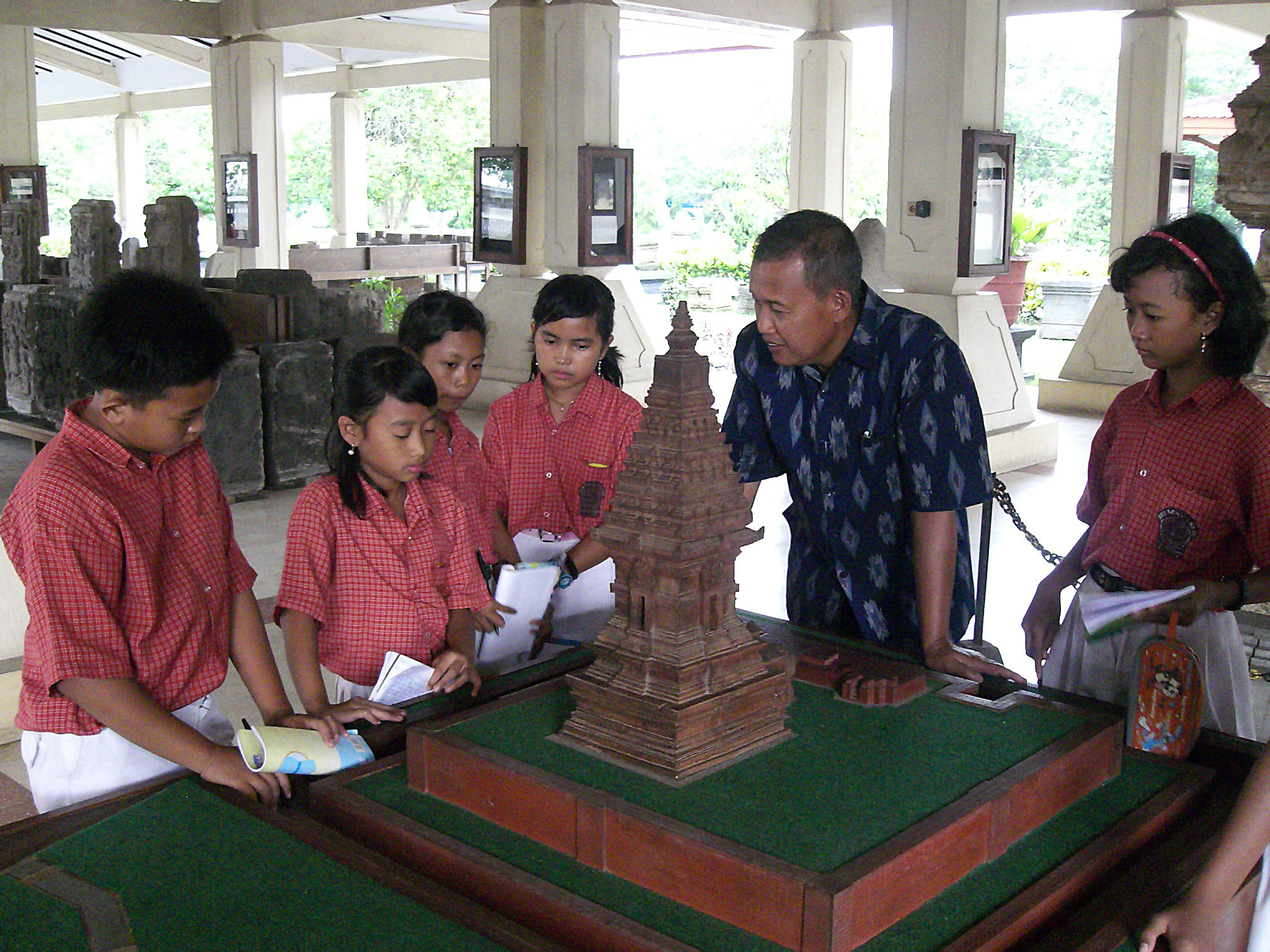
A maquette of Jawi temple in Trowulan Museum.

According to Nagarakretagama, in the year 1359 CE, on his return from an extended tour of the eastern provinces, King Hayam Wuruk of Majapahit stopped off at the temple of Jajawa (Jawi) at Pandaan, in the foothills of Mount Welirang. His purpose was to place offerings at the shrine of his great-grandfather Kertanagara, the last king of Singhasari, in whose memory the temple had been built. The Nagarakretagama describes in great detail the magnificence of the sacred compound. The principal monument, in particular, was unique in that it was a Shivaite sanctuary crowned with a Buddhist ornament. It thus reflected the advanced religious philosophy expounded by Kertanagara, who is said on his death, to have returned to the realm of 'ShivaBuddha'. The shrine further contained two mortuary statues of the king, representing the essence of both religions. Yet, as Prapanca explains in his poem, the image of the Buddha Akshobya had mysteriously disappeared at a time when the monument had been struck by lightning in 1331. While regretting that the statue had vanished, it was accepted as a sign of the Buddha's supreme manifestation, Śūnyatā that of non-being or nothingness.

There were also other Shivaite statues discovered in temple niches, such as the image of Nandisvara, Durga, Ganesha, Nandi and Brahma, however these statues have been removed and stored in the museums. The statue of Durga is stored in Mpu Tantular Museum, Surabaya, while the rest are stored in Trowulan Museum. The Brahma statue however is missing, probably broken to pieces since fragments of the statue can be found in temple's store room. The temple had undergone restoration projects twice, the first was conducted between 1938–1941 and the second was in 1975–1980. The temple reconstruction project completed in 1982.

== See also ==
- Candi of Indonesia
- Hinduism in Java
- Indonesian Esoteric Buddhism
- Jago Temple
- Singhasari temple

== Gallery ==
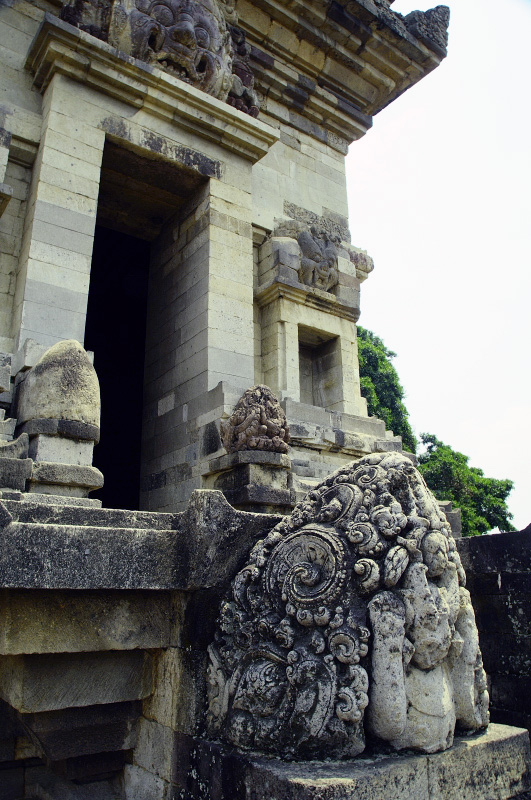
The portal of Candi Jawi

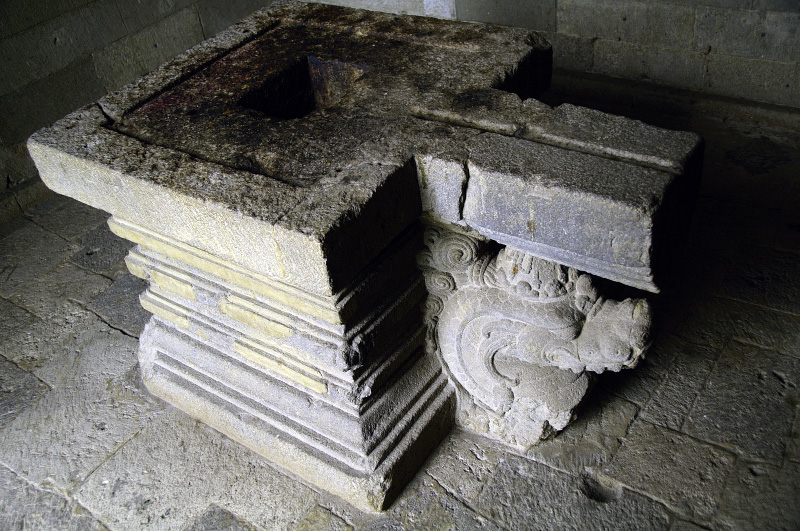
Yoni inside the garbagriha (main chamber)

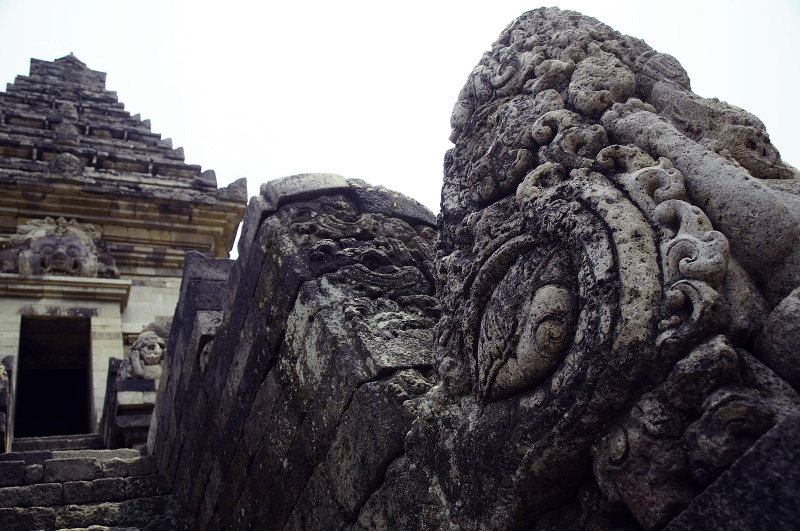
Makara flanking the stairs
