= Trigonopterus acuminatus =

Scientific classification
- Kingdom: Animalia
- Phylum: Arthropoda
- Clade: Pancrustacea
- Class: Insecta
- Order: Coleoptera
- Suborder: Polyphaga
- Infraorder: Cucujiformia
- Family: Curculionidae
- Genus: Trigonopterus
- Species: T. acuminatus

Binomial name
- Trigonopterus acuminatus Riedel, 2014

Species of beetle

Trigonopterus acuminatus is a species of flightless weevil in the genus Trigonopterus from Indonesia. The species was described in 2014 and is named after the shape of its elytra. The beetle is 2.74–3.14 mm long. It has reddish-brown legs and antennae, while the rest of the body is black. Endemic to East Java, where it is known only from Mount Wilis at elevations of 1,379–1,485 metres (4,524–4,872 ft).

== Taxonomy ==
Trigonopterus acuminatus was described by the entomologist Alexander Riedel in 2014 on the basis of an adult male specimen collected from Mount Wilis on the island of Java in Indonesia. The specific name is derived from Latin acuminatus, meaning "pointed", and refers to the shape of its elytra.

== Description ==
The beetle is 2.74–3.14 mm long. It has reddish-brown legs and antennae, while the rest of the body is black. Its body is elongated, with a noticeable narrowing between the pronotum and elytra when viewed from above, and it appears convex in profile. The rostrum features a central ridge and two submedian ridges, with the grooves between them each containing a sparse row of upright, hair-like (piliform) scales. The epistome has a faint, transverse, slightly angled ridge.

The pronotum shows a weak narrowing near the front and is densely covered with punctures. The spaces between the punctures are finely textured and bear a mix of flat and upright hair-like scales. The elytra have faint grooves marked by fine lines and rows of small punctures. The flat areas between the grooves are also finely textured and punctured, with sparse, flat hairs. Along the base, there are longer, semi-upright piliform scales. In the apical quarter, interval 7 forms a lateral edge, and the sutural interval creates a pair of small projections above the nearly straight elytral tip, which are hidden from a top view.

The femora are not toothed and the underside ridge is weakly crenulate. The hind femur has a stridulatory patch near the tip. The upper edge of the hind tibia has small teeth in its basal third, and the middle tibia has a sharp tooth formed by an angled projection near the base. The first two abdominal segments are slightly sunken and mostly smooth, while the fifth segment has a shallow central pit.

In males, the penis has slightly concave sides and a rounded tip. The transfer apparatus is thick, flagelliform, and twice the length of the penis. The apodemes are 2.1 times the length of the penis. The ductus ejaculatorius lacks a distinct bulb.

In females, the rostrum features a central ridge and two submedian ridges that are smooth. The epistome is simple in structure. The integument of females shows a less distinct fine texture, and the piliform scales are shorter and more sparsely distributed compared to males. The tip of the elytra is slightly shorter, with the sutural intervals forming a pair of small tubercles. The first two abdominal segments (ventrites) are flat, as is ventrite 5.

== Distribution ==
Trigonopterus acuminatus is endemic to the Indonesian province of East Java, where it is known only from Mount Wilis. It has been recorded from elevations of 1,379–1,485 metres (4,524–4,872 ft).
