= Taman Safari =

Indonesia conservation theme park group

Taman Safari Indonesia
- Interactive map of Taman Safari Indonesia
- 6.7203156°S 106.9505096°E
- Date opened: 16 March 1990 (Taman Safari I); 27 December 1997 (Taman Safari II); 13 November 2007 (Taman Safari III)
- Location: Cisarua, Bogor, West Java, Indonesia (Taman Safari I); Prigen, Pasuruan, East Java, Indonesia (Taman Safari II); Gianyar Regency, Bali, Indonesia (Taman Safari III)
- No. of animals: 3000
- Memberships: WAZA, SEAZA, CBSG, and PKBSI
- Website: www.tamansafari.com

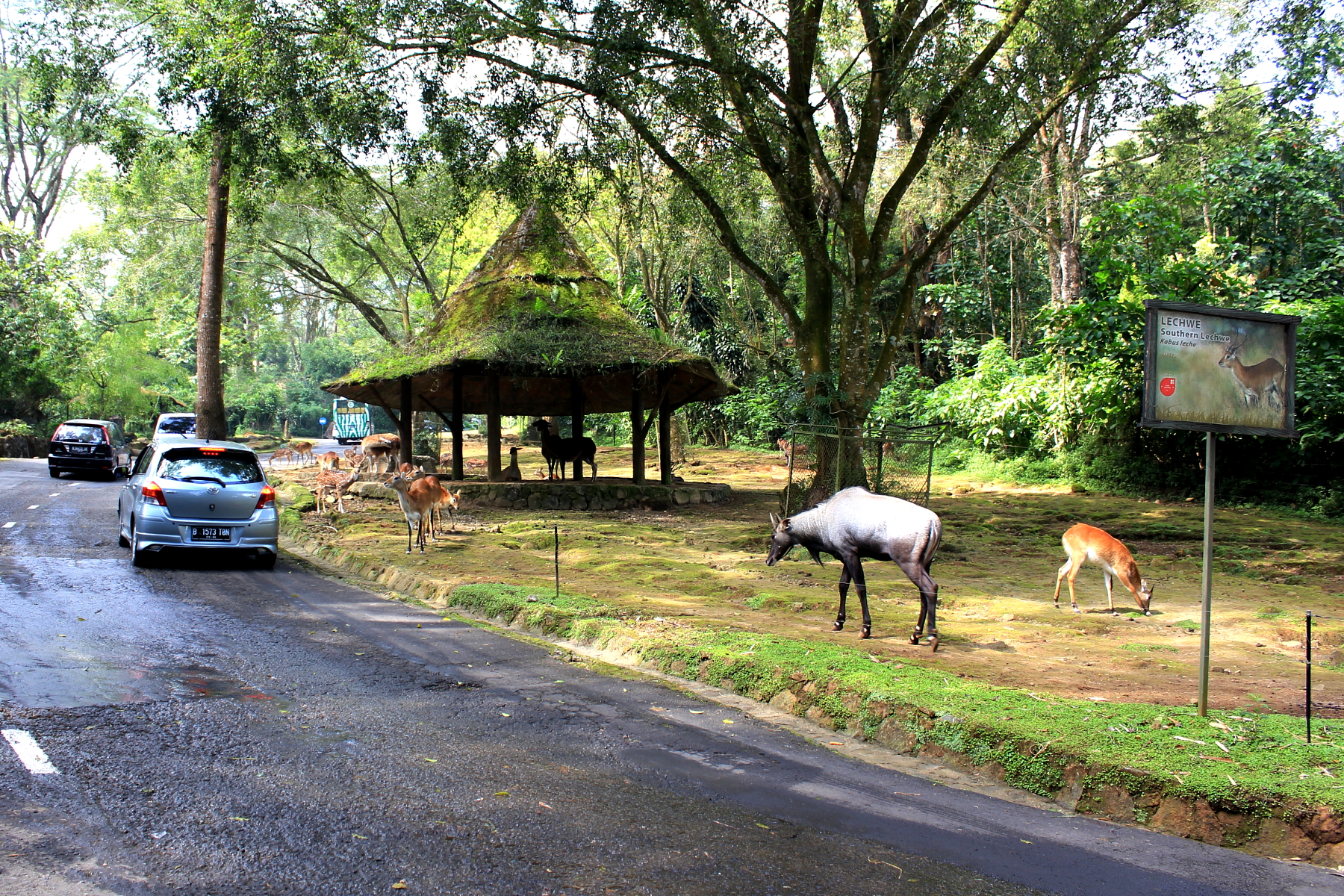
Taman Safari Indonesia

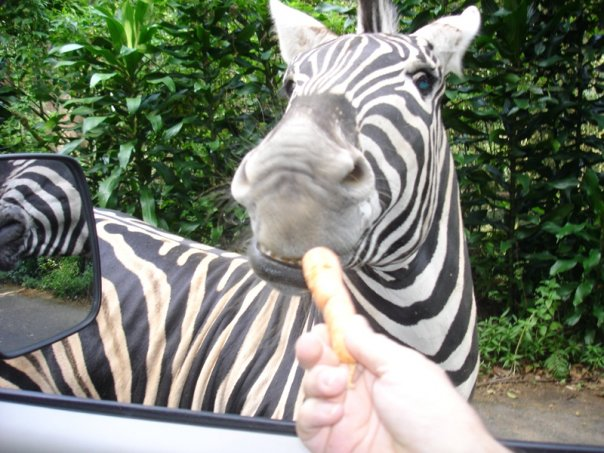
Zebra at Taman Safari I

Taman Safari Indonesia, or simply Taman Safari, refers to animal theme parks located in Cisarua, Prigen, and Bali. These parks are part of the same organization and are known as Taman Safari I, II, and III. Taman Safari I is the most popular of the three.

== Taman Safari I ==
Taman Safari I, also known as Taman Safari Bogor, is located in the district of Cisarua in Bogor Regency, on the old main road between Jakarta and Bandung, West Java. It is approximately 80 kilometers (50 miles) from Soekarno-Hatta International Airport in Jakarta and 78 kilometers (48 miles) from Bandung. Taman Safari I is situated in Puncak, a popular tourist area in West Java.

Taman Safari I covers an area of 170 hectares (420 acres) and houses a collection of more than 3,000 animals, including Bengal tigers, Malayan sun bears, giraffes, orangutans, hippos, zebras, and Sumatran elephants. Some animals, such as the Bali myna, are involved in conservation projects. The majority of the species represented are African.

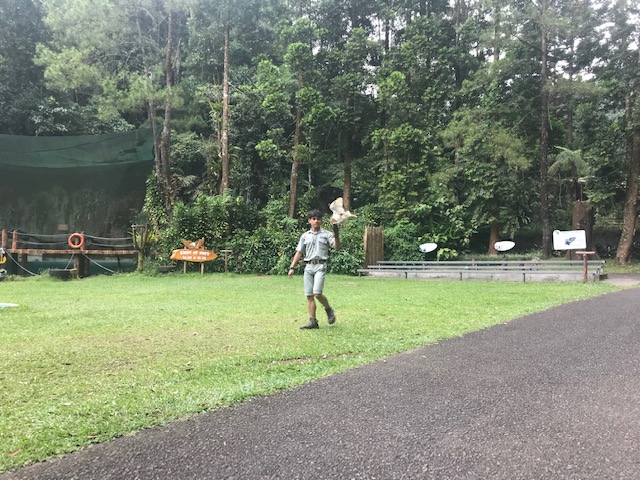
Birds of prey show at Taman Safari Indonesia

Nine shows are offered at Taman Safari I: the Elephant Show, Safari Theater, Various Animals Show, Tiger Show, Sea Lion Show, Bird of Prey Show, Dolphin Show, Cowboy Show, and the Globe of Death.

Near the Wild Wild West area, visitors can see Jaksa Waterfall. To reach the waterfall, visitors can take the road train or walk approximately 500 meters. Jaksa Waterfall is 45 meters tall, and the pool underneath is shallow enough for children to play in. The water of Jaksa Waterfall originates from the foot of Mount Gede Pangrango. With some luck, visitors might also spot native wildlife, including various primates and birds. According to local legend, washing one's face with Jaksa Waterfall's water can make it easier to find a mate, secure sustenance, and stay youthful. Additionally, Taman Safari provides facilities such as a canteen and changing rooms.

Every weeknight or holiday night, visitors can explore the Safari Journey at night on a road train accompanied by guides. Near the end of the trip, visitors can watch the Spectacular Light Dance, featuring fire performances by the performers. The zoo's Javan warty pig can only be seen during the Night Safari.

=== History ===
Taman Safari I was established in 1980 on 50 hectares of previously unproductive plantation land. In 1990, the park was designated a National Tourism Object by Susilo Sudarman, the Minister of Tourism, Postal, and Telecommunications at that time.

In September 2017, Taman Safari introduced two giant pandas named Cai Tao (蔡涛) and Hu Chun (胡春). Cai Tao and Hu Chun were born at the Bifengxia Panda Base in Bifengxia, Ya'an, Sichuan, China. Their arrival was a long-anticipated event, marked by the construction of the "Panda Palace," which would become their home at Taman Safari. The pandas traveled over 4,400 kilometers, departing from Shuangliu International Airport in Chengdu, China, on 28 September 2017. After a five-and-a-half-hour flight, they arrived at Soekarno–Hatta International Airport. Following an adjustment period of approximately two months, Cai Tao and Hu Chun were displayed to the public in November 2017. In front of the Panda Palace are two replica statues of the pandas welcoming visitors. The Panda Palace is also equipped with several facilities, including a food court and a souvenir store. To minimize noise from vehicles, visitors must take a bus to reach the Panda Palace. In 2025, Hu Chun gave birth to a cub named Satrio Wiratama, marking the first time that a giant panda had been born in Indonesia.

== The Grand Taman Safari Prigen ==
The Grand Taman Safari Prigen (formerly Taman Safari II) is a branch of Taman Safari located in Prigen, Pasuruan, East Java (7.761171°S 112.66722°E). It is about 50 kilometres (31 mi) from Juanda International Airport in Surabaya and about 45 kilometres (28 mi) from Malang. Situated on the slope of Mount Arjuno, the park is located 800 to 1,500 metres (2,600 to 4,900 ft) above sea level and covers approximately 350 hectares (860 acres), making it one of the largest safari parks in Asia.

== Bali Safari and Marine Park ==
Bali Safari and Marine Park is a branch of Taman Safari located in Marina Beach, Bali.

== Safari Beach Jateng ==
Safari Beach Jateng is a branch of Taman Safari located at Sigandu Beach, Batang Regency, Central Java The park primarily focuses on bottlenose dolphins but also features other animal exhibits, including a sea turtle touch pool, a mini safari, a bird aviary, reptile exhibits, and a freshwater aquarium. It was formerly known as Batang Dolphin Center.

== Solo Safari ==
Solo Safari is a branch of Taman Safari located in Surakarta, Central Java. It is notably smaller than the other three Taman Safari parks and was opened on 27 January 2023 by the mayor of Surakarta, Gibran Rakabuming Raka. Unlike the drive-in safaris at the other parks, Solo Safari features two large walk-in exhibits (or walk-in safaris) showcasing fauna from Asia and Africa, as well as waterfowl such as pelicans and cormorants. It also has various other exhibits featuring animals such as binturongs and otters. Formerly known as Jurug Zoo Solo (also called Taru Jurug Animal Park), it was acquired and revitalized by the Taman Safari group and the mayor of Surakarta in 2022. Some of the animals at Solo Safari were transferred from the old park, with additional new additions as well.

Exhibit animals:

- *Asian Panorama*: sun bear, banteng, yak, Javan rusa, bawean deer, spotted deer, nilgai, southern cassowary, blackbuck, Malayan tapir * Komodo: Komodo dragon, green iguana, reticulated python, corn snake, African spurred tortoise
- Primate Island: orangutan, siamang, silvery gibbon, agile gibbon, Australian pelican, Muscovy duck, little black cormorant, domestic goose, purple heron
- Camel Ride: bactrian camel, dromedary
- Aviary: Javan myna, black-winged starling, green peafowl, blue-and-gold macaw, Moluccan eclectus, black-naped oriole, yellow-crested cockatoo, palm cockatoo, Tanimbar corella, rhinoceros hornbill, wreathed hornbill, oriental pied hornbill, Javan hawk-eagle, brahminy kite, crested goshawk, changeable hawk-eagle, crested serpent eagle, white-bellied sea eagle, black swan, javan pied myna
- Jungle River: pygmy hippo, hippo, saltwater crocodile, false gharial, Asian small-clawed otter
- Mankunde Restaurant: lion, meerkat, Sunda leopard cat
- Petting Zoo: Sumbawa Pony, domestic rabbit, African spurred tortoise, bantam chicken, koi, Pygmy (UK goat breed)
- African Savannah: Ankole-Watusi, common eland, waterbuck, common ostrich, Grant's zebra, lechwe, sitatunga, blue wildebeest
- Other species: lowland anoa, Asian palm civet, binturong, agile wallaby, Javan langur, domestic turkey, domestic guineafowl, serval, eastern barn owl, Moluccan cockatoo, sulphur-crested cockatoo, Sumatran elephant, Bengal tiger

== Jakarta Aquarium ==
Jakarta Aquarium is located inside the Neo Soho Mall in Jakarta. The aquarium features saltwater, freshwater, brackish, and land animals from around the world.

== Criticism ==
=== Allegations of drug use ===
The company came under fire in April 2016 for its alleged practice of drugging wild animals to use them as props in photographs with tourists. The company stated that the lion pictured had not been drugged and was "just sleepy."

=== Wildlife smuggling ===
In 2019, The Criminal Investigation Agency of the Indonesian National Police seized 8 endangered species from Taman Safari Bogor. 8 endangered species once belonged to Abdul Hopir, wildlife smuggler based in Bandung. Hopir handed those species to Taman Safari Bogor in order to launder its status as legal. Before that Hopir also has sold 4 golden cats to Taman Safari Bogor a year prior.

Taman Safari also accused of illegal smuggling of dolphins. Femke den Haas, founder of Jakarta Animal Aid Network investigated the matter in 2012. den Haas investigated every dolphin conservatory in Indonesia, including the Batang Dolphin Center that belonged to Taman Safari. den Haas concluded her investigation by stating that Batang Dolphin Center is a front for wildlife smuggling. Most dolphins there were bought from the fishermen to be trained and later sold to the circuses.

=== Oriental Circus Indonesia ===
In 1997, Indonesian National Commission on Human Rights received a report of accusation of human trafficking and child exploitation from an escaped performer of Oriental Circus Indonesia, a circus producer affiliated with Taman Safari Indonesia. The investigation however only lasted until 1999 due to lack of evidence being found in the report.

The accusation would later resurfaced in 2025, 5 years after the circus got disbanded. In April 2025, a group of former child performers in the circus confessed that they were taken away from their parents by the owner of Oriental Circus Indonesia since toddler with pretext of being sent to study overseas, however most of the children were soon being forced to do a circus performance. Victims of Oriental Circus Indonesia exposed the human rights abuses they received ranging from torture, denial of access to formal education, and the erasure of their real identities. Commissioner of Taman Safari Indonesia and one of Oriental Circus Indonesia founder Tony Sumampouw denied the accusation of former performers and stated that the children were taken from Kalijodo red-light district orphanage in North Jakarta. However one performer denied that she was taken from Kalijodo and stated she and other performers being bought by the owners from their economically struggling parents. Attorney representing the victims of Oriental Circus Indonesia, Muhammad Sholeh stated that the secret bunker used to torture and exploit underaged circus performers were located inside the precinct of Taman Safari Indonesia that was said to be private residence of the circus founder Hadi Manansang. On the same press conference, Sholeh also urged citizens to boycott Taman Safari Indonesia due to serious human rights abuses being perpetrated by its founders.

== Gallery ==
Taman Safari I

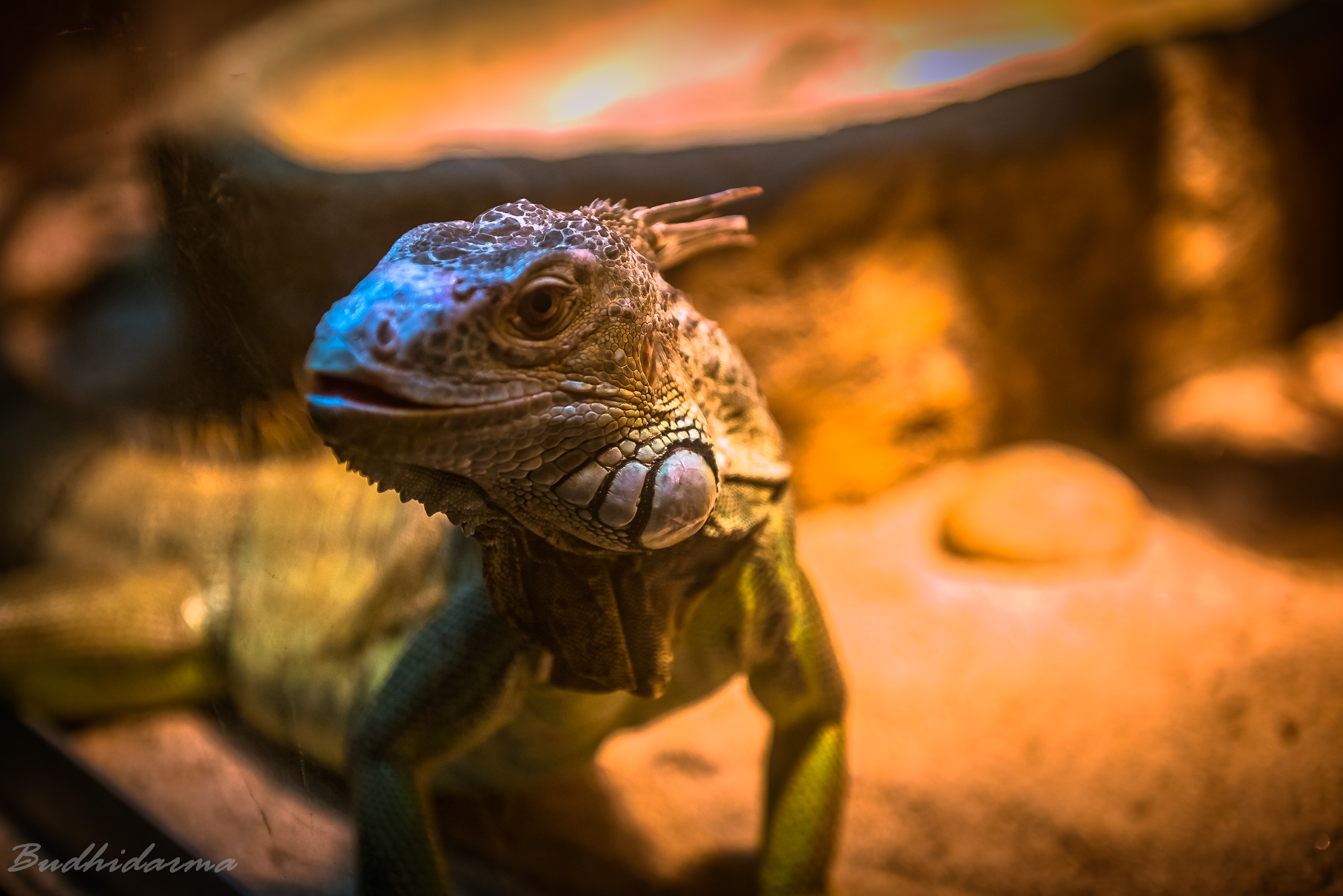
Green iguana

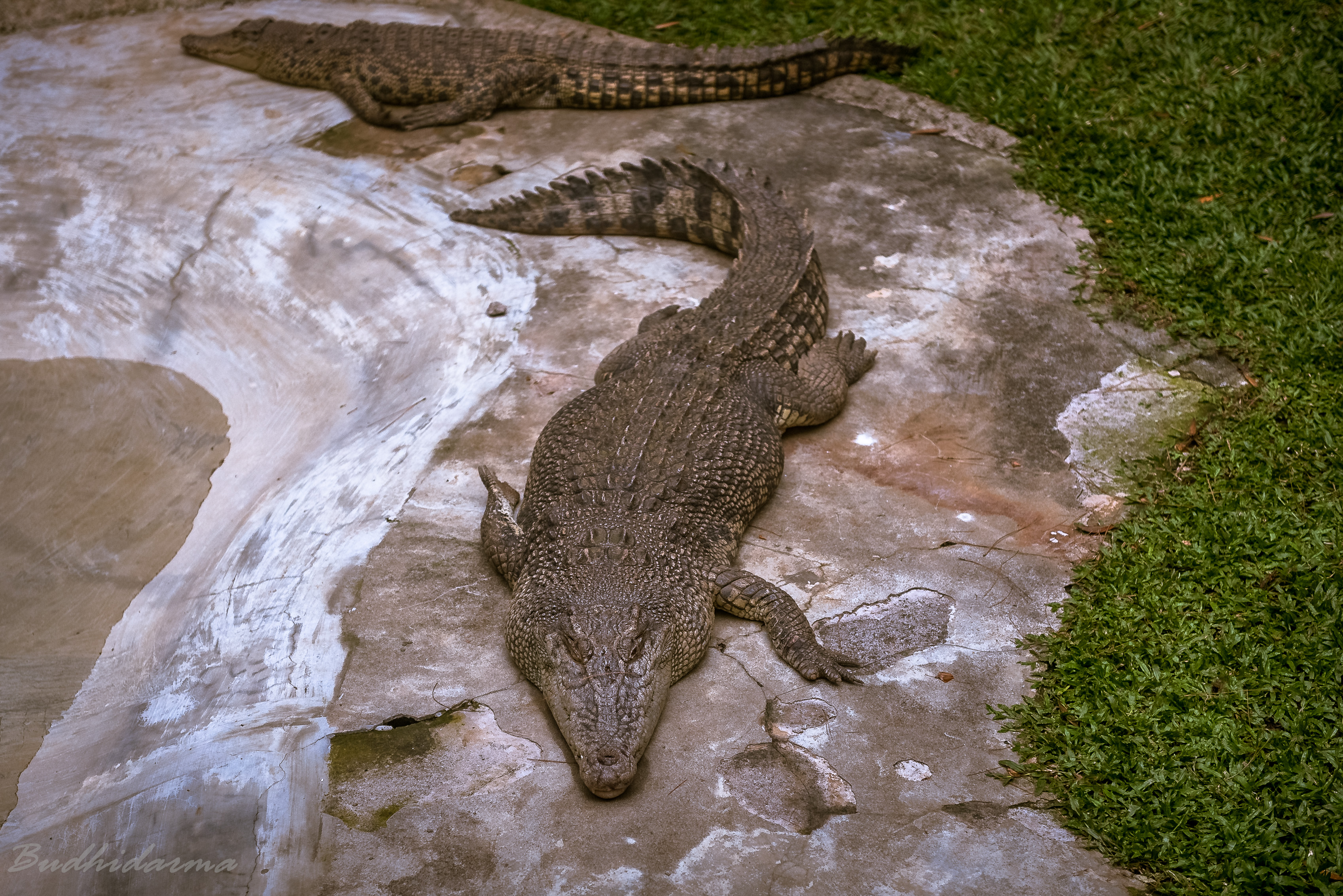
Saltwater crocodile

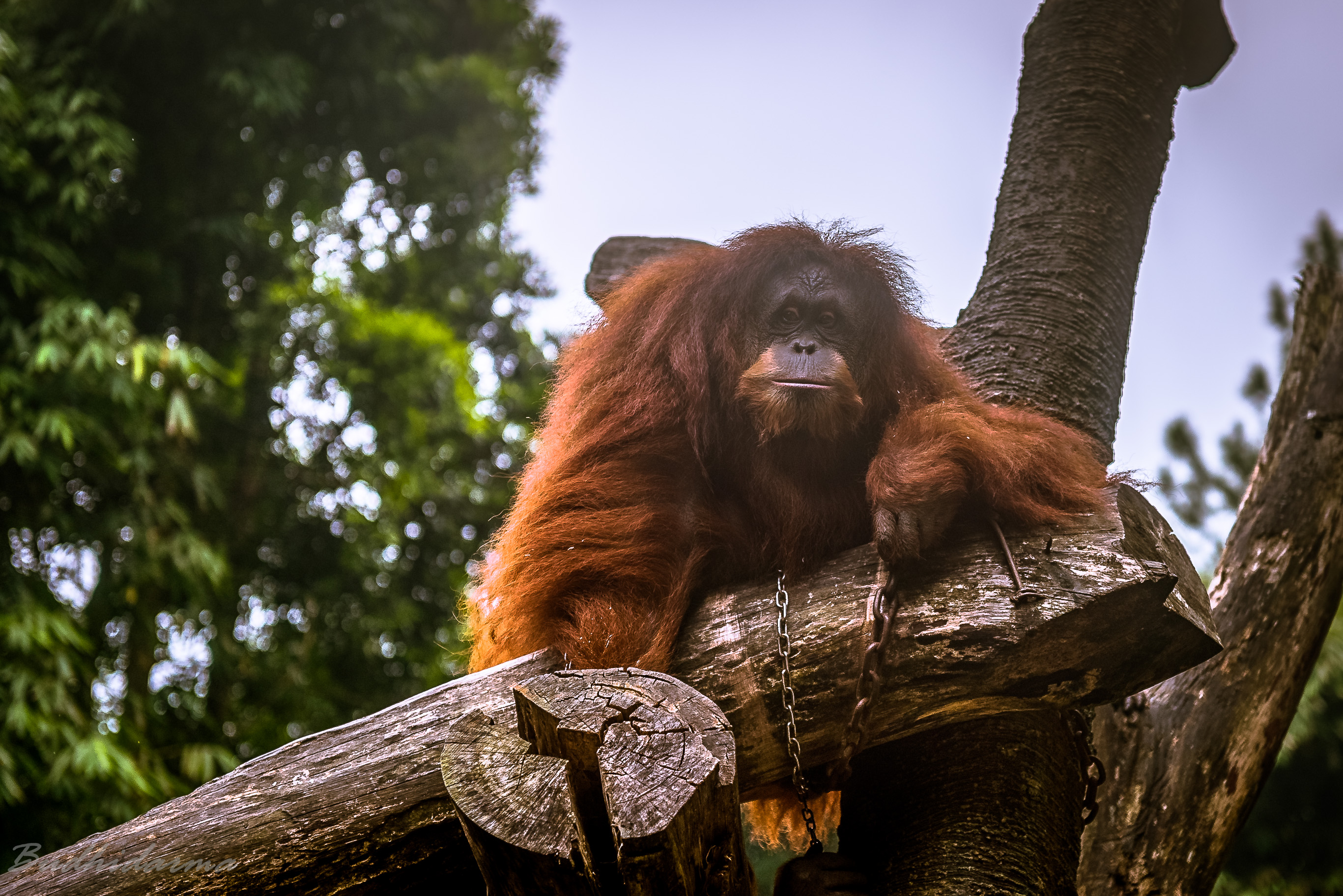
Orangutan

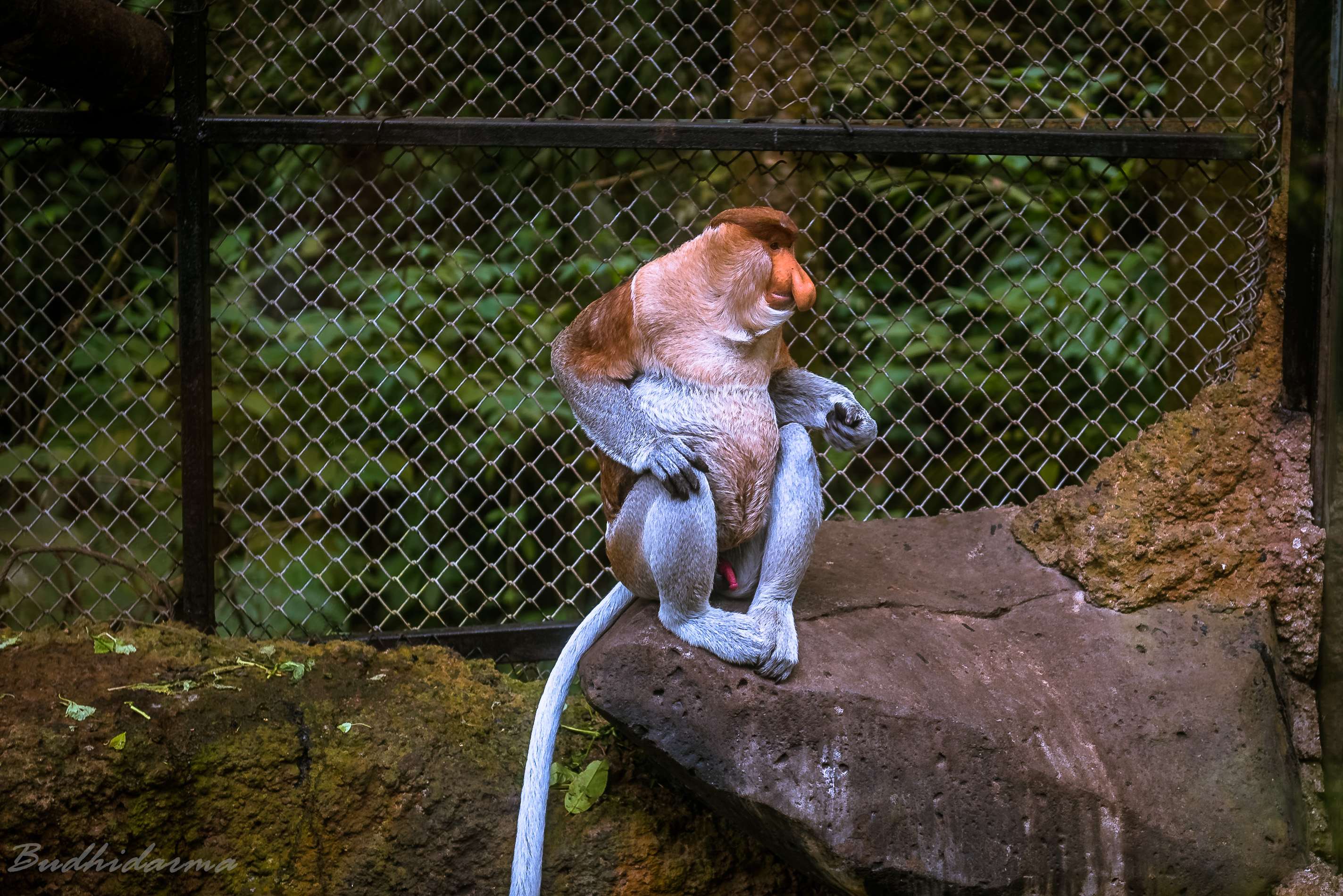
Proboscis monkey

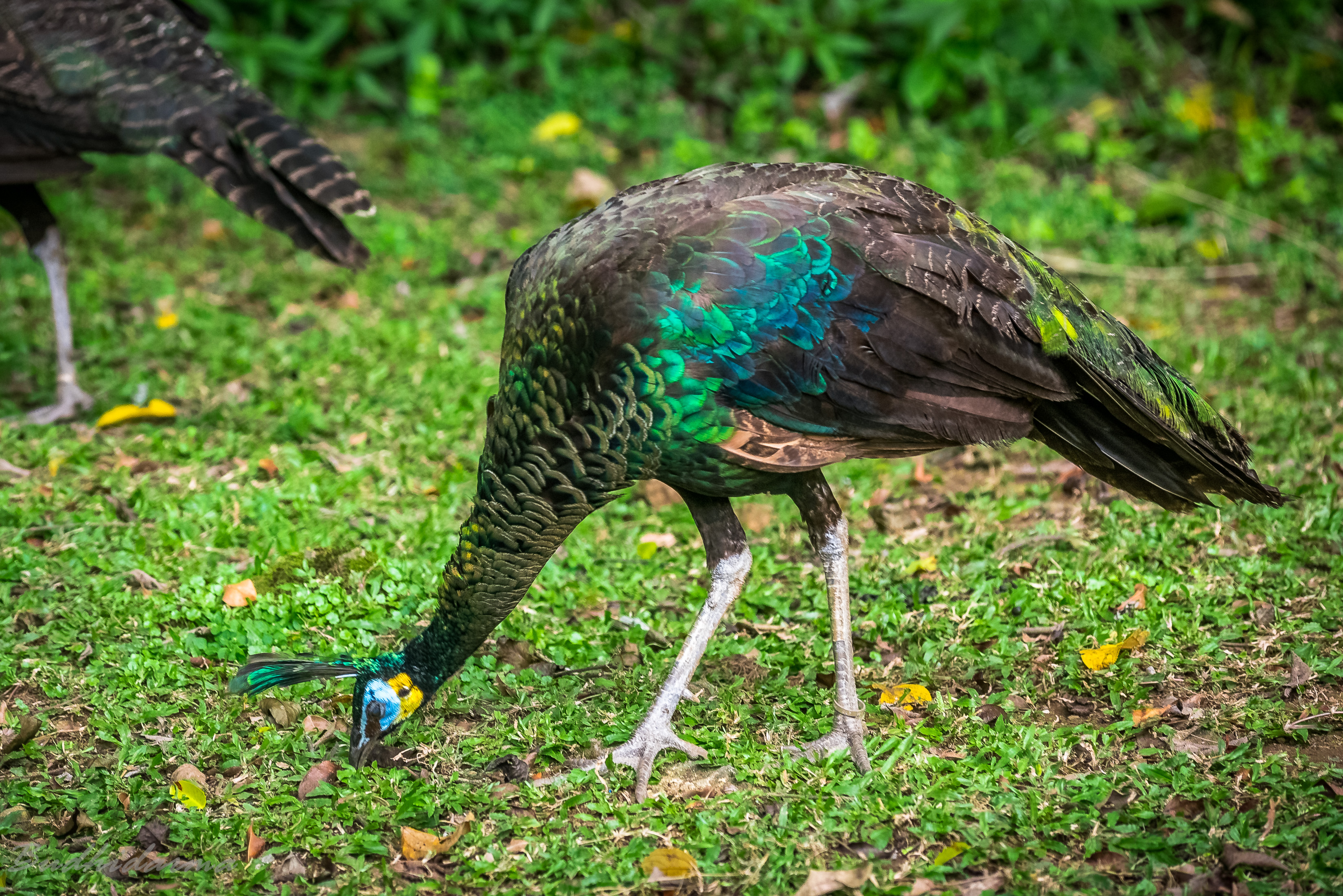
Green peafowl

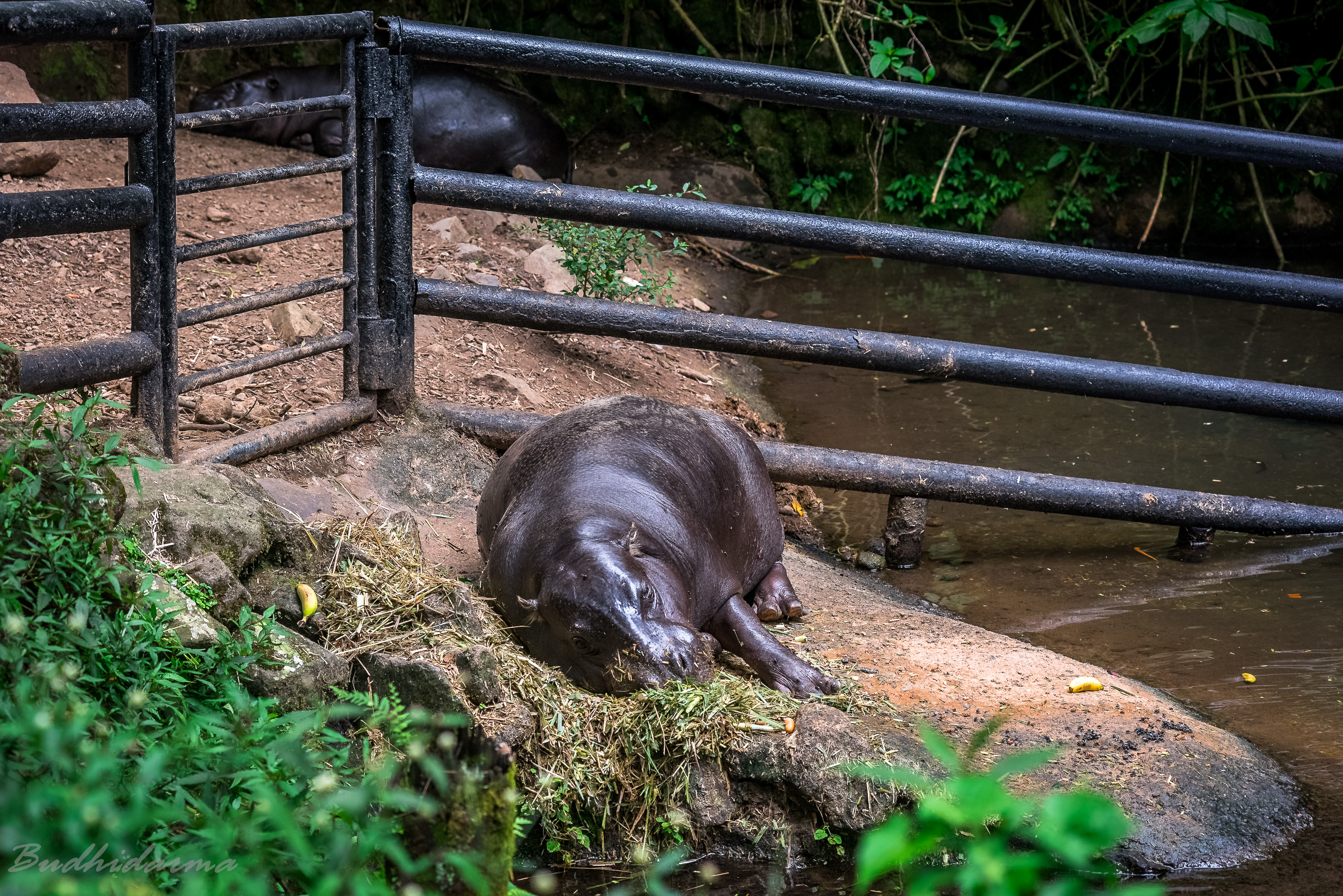
Pygmy hippopotamus

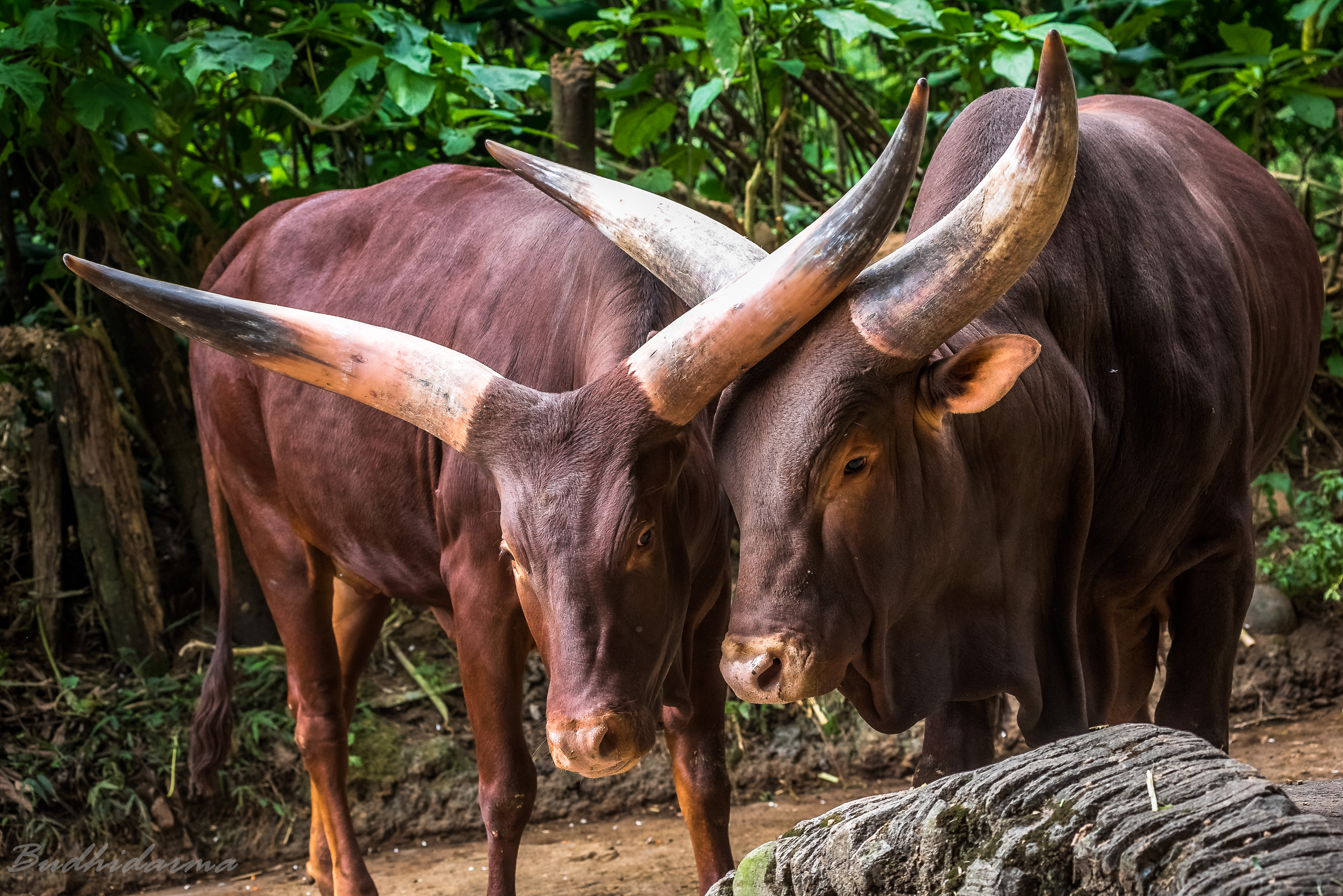
Ankole-Watusi

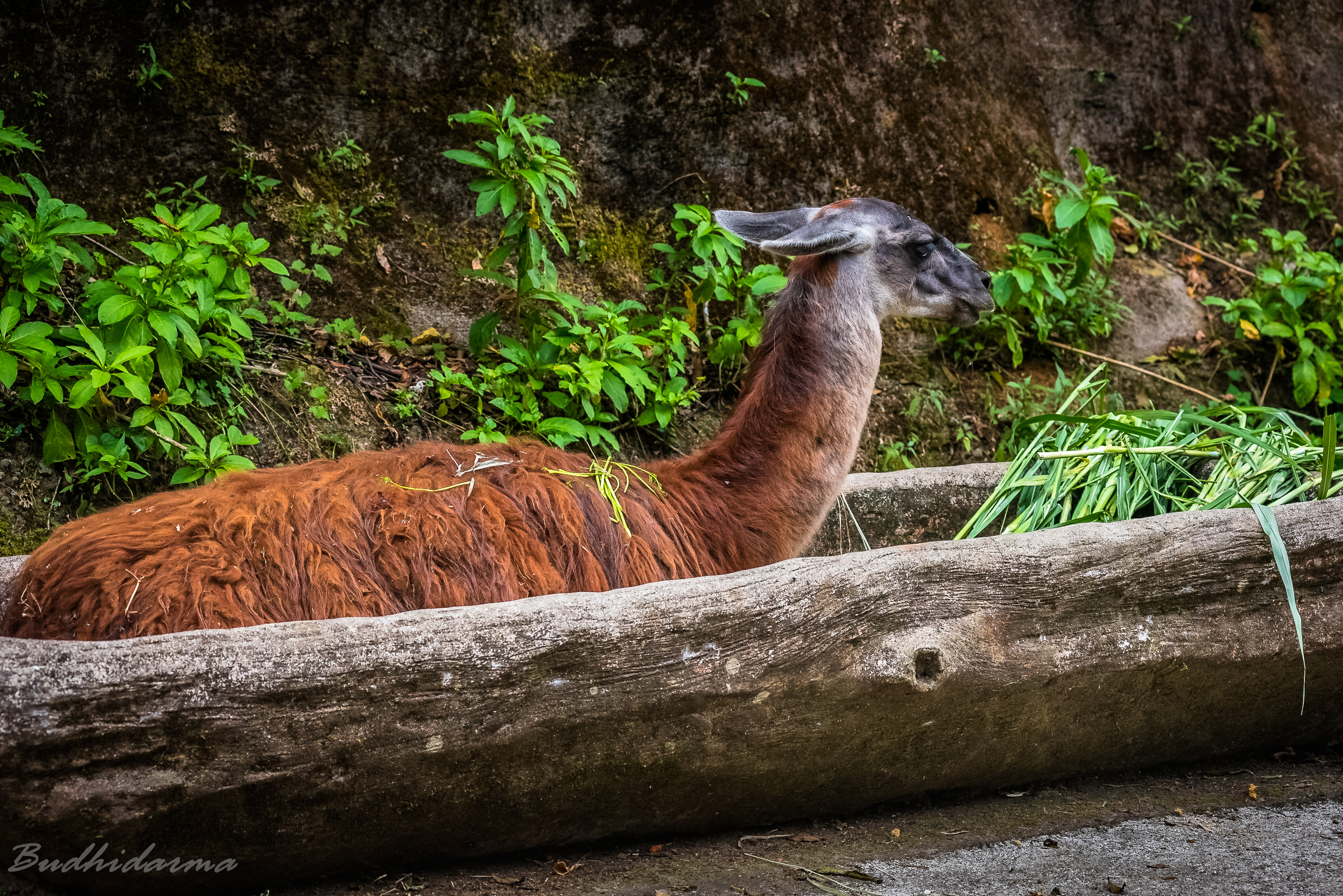
Guanaco

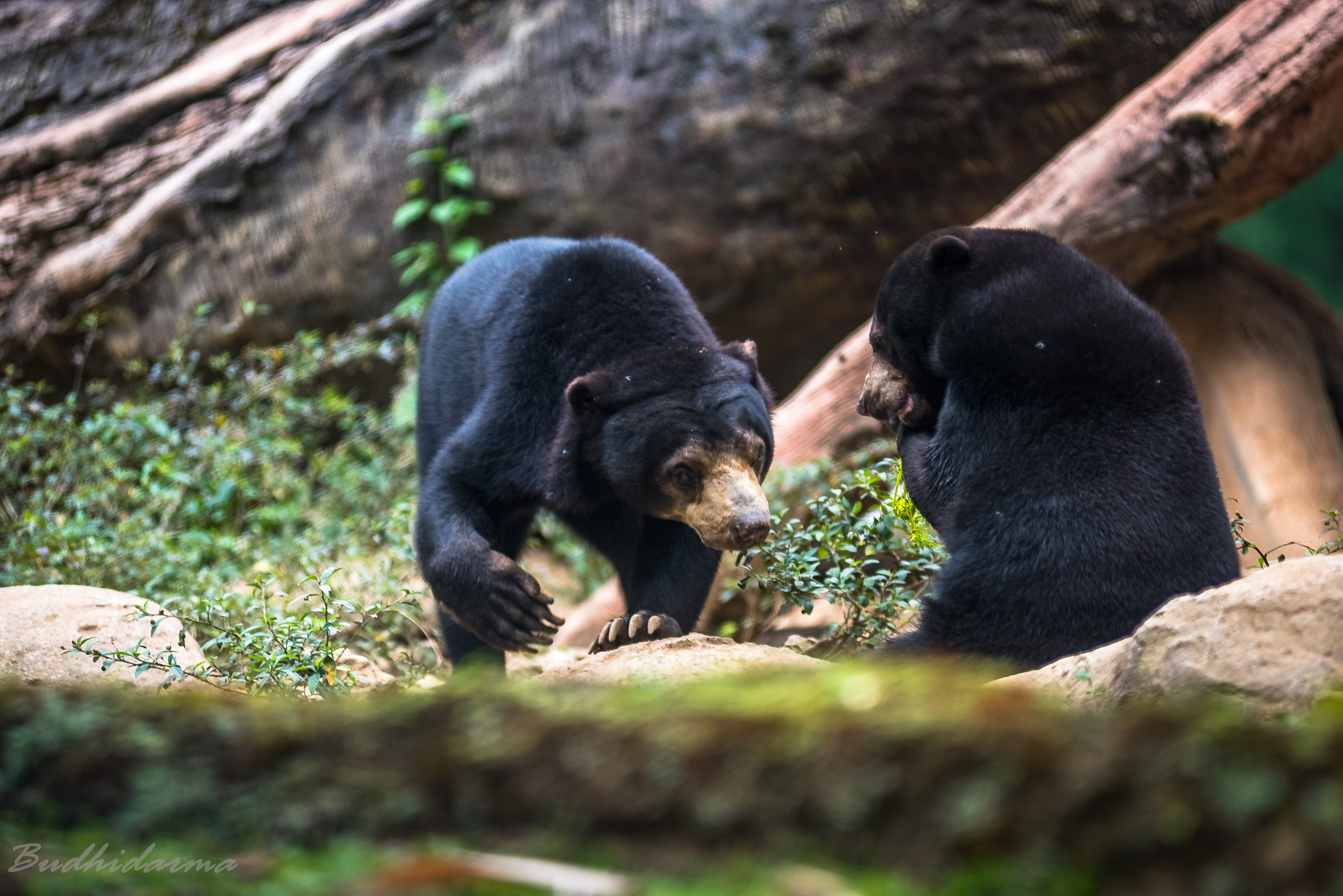
Sun bear

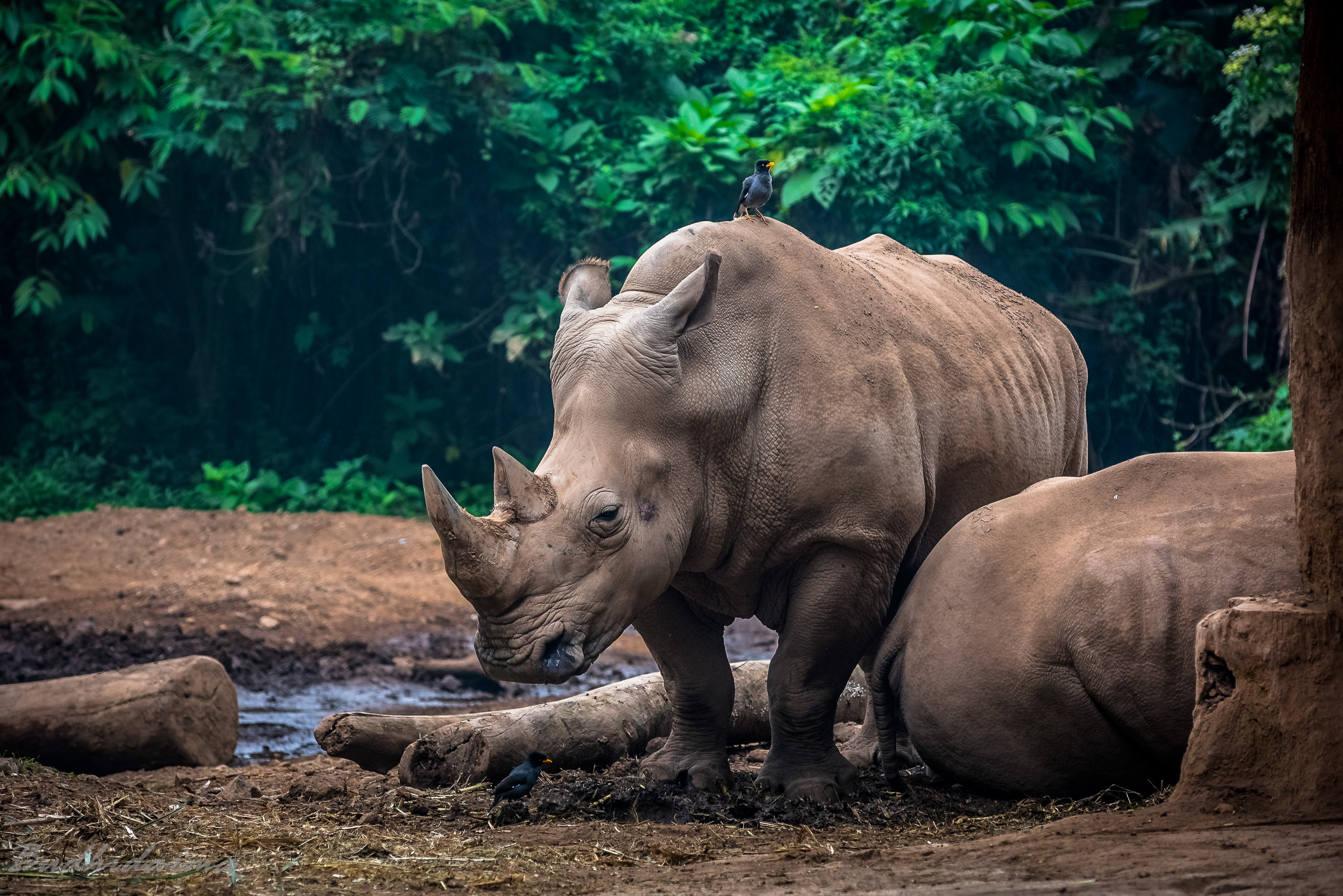
White rhinoceros

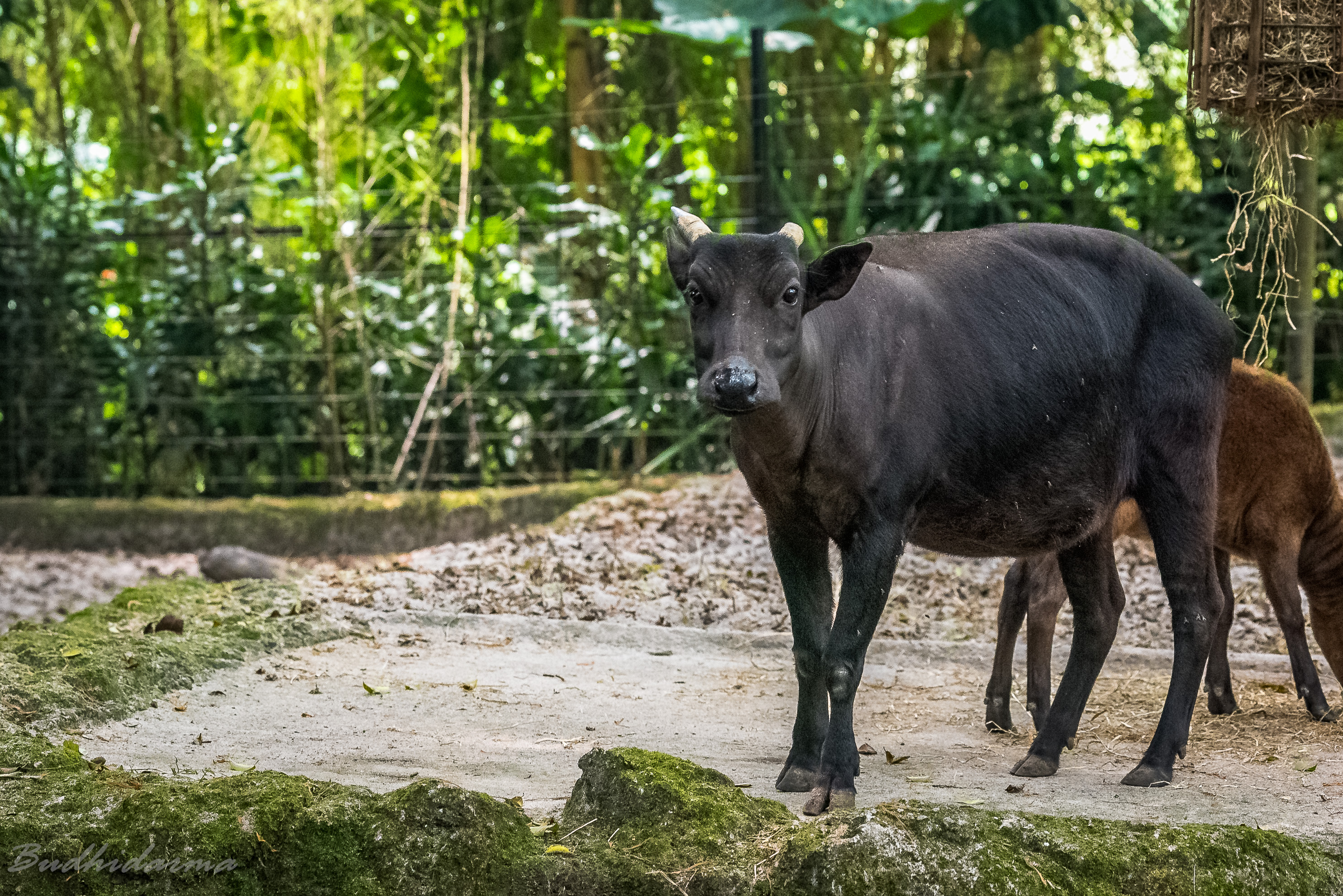
Lowland anoa

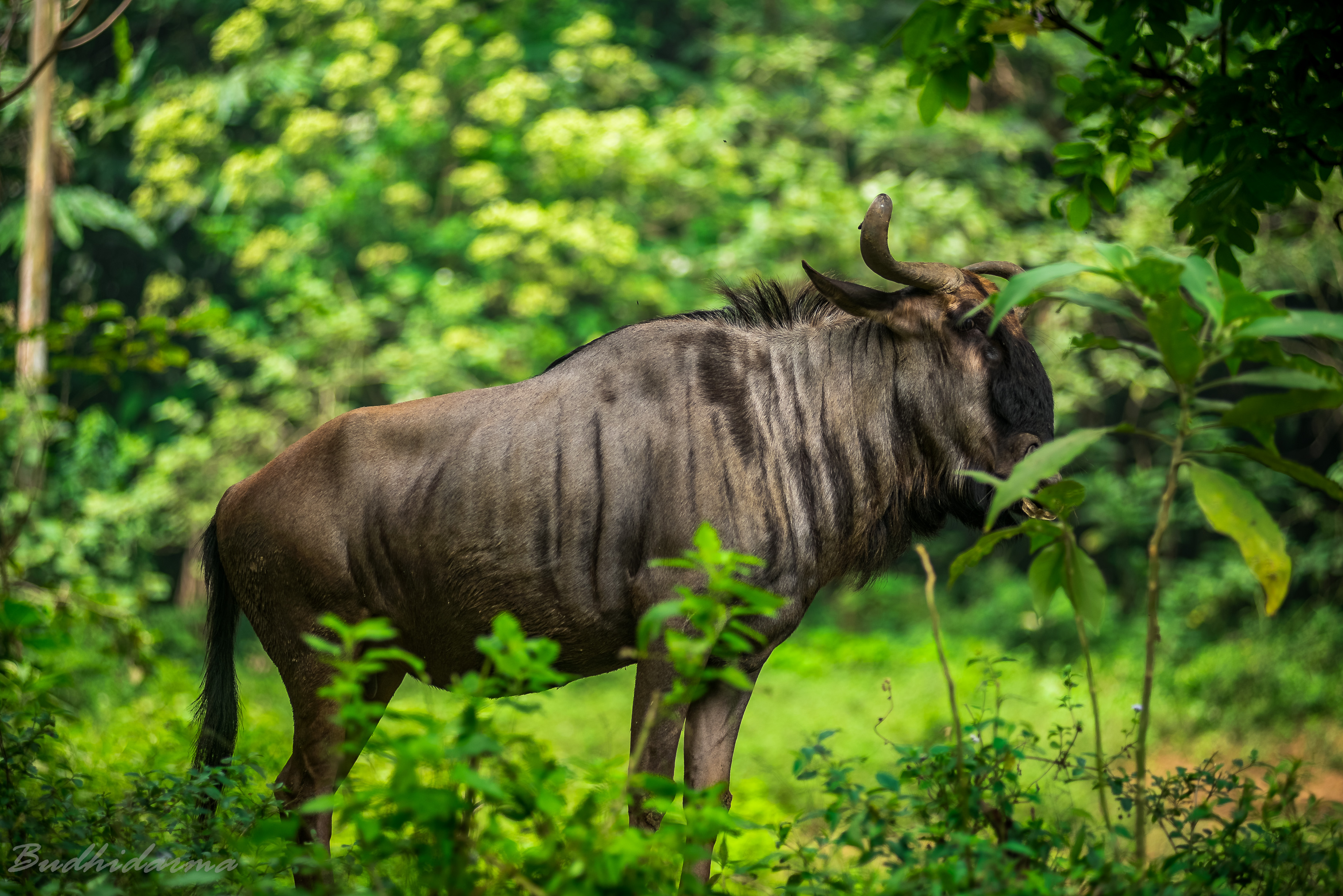
Blue wildebeest

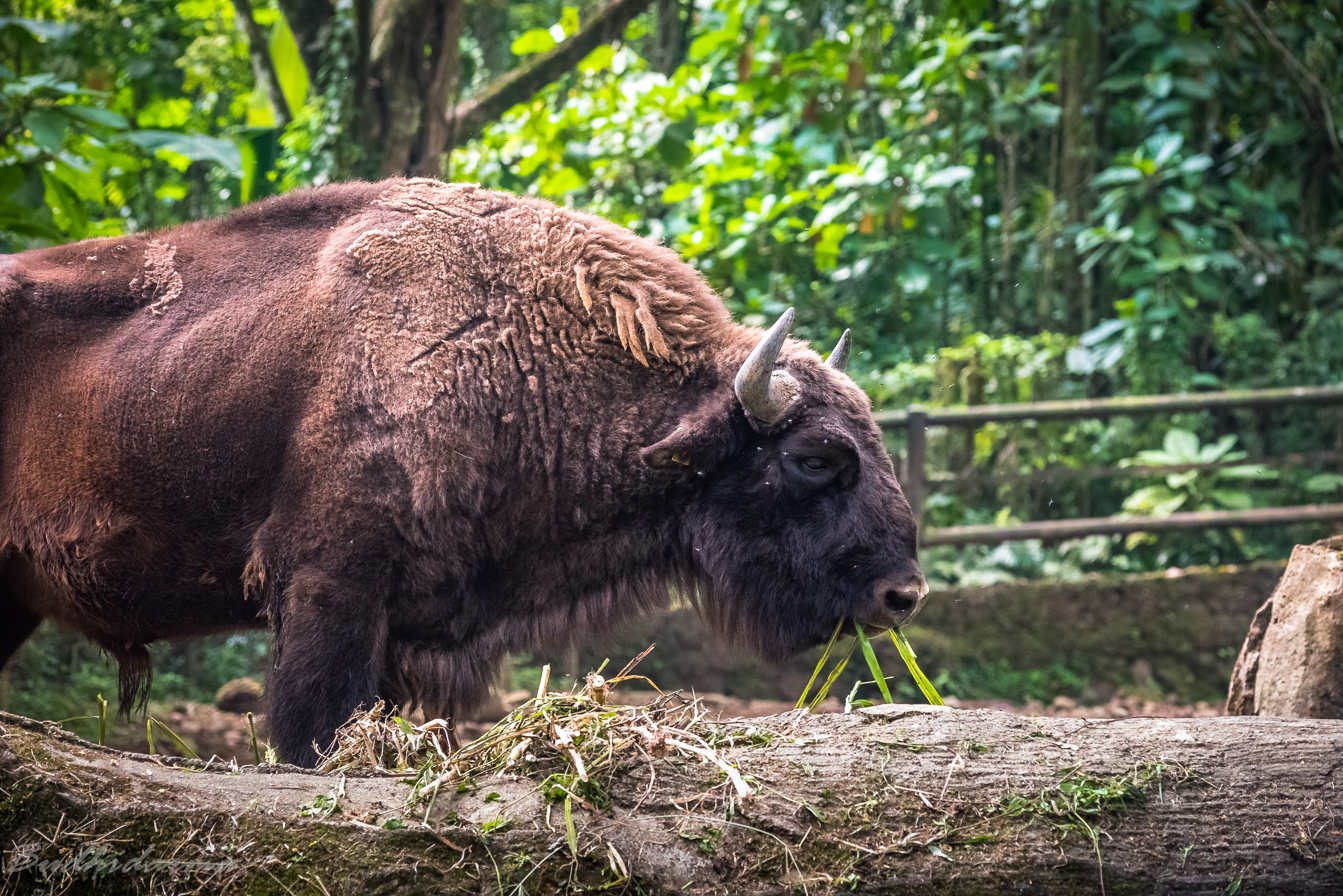
European bison

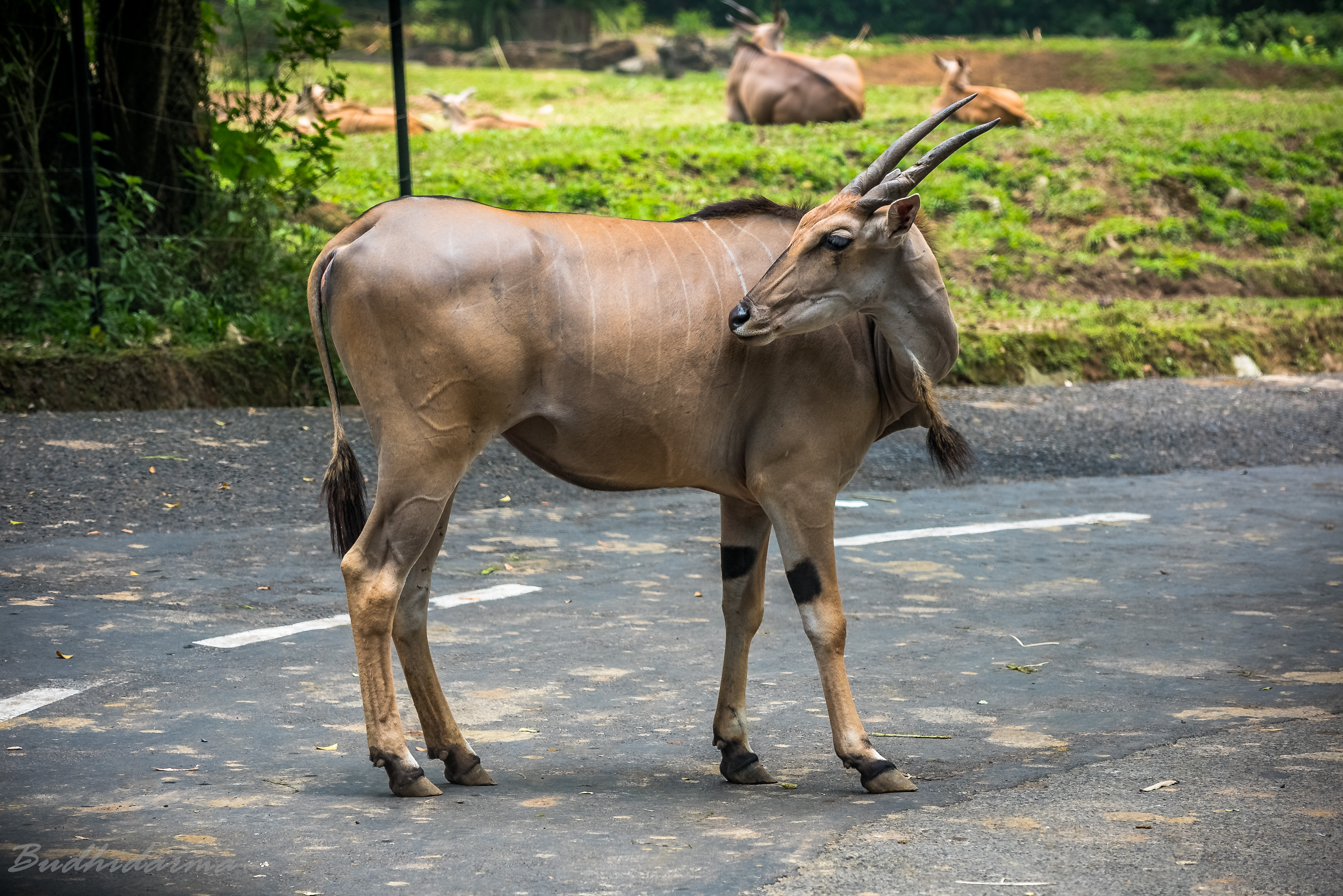
Common eland

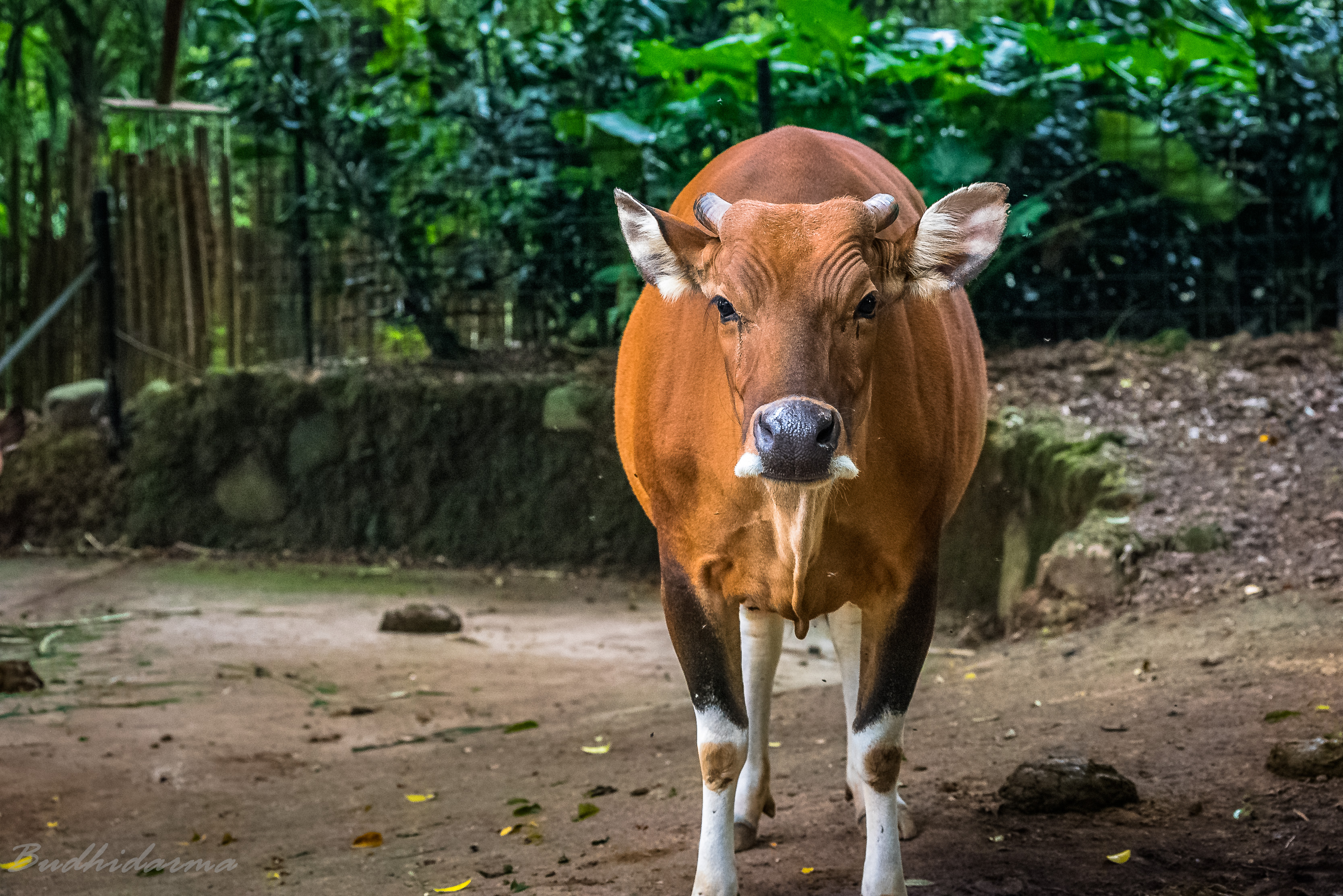
Javan Banteng

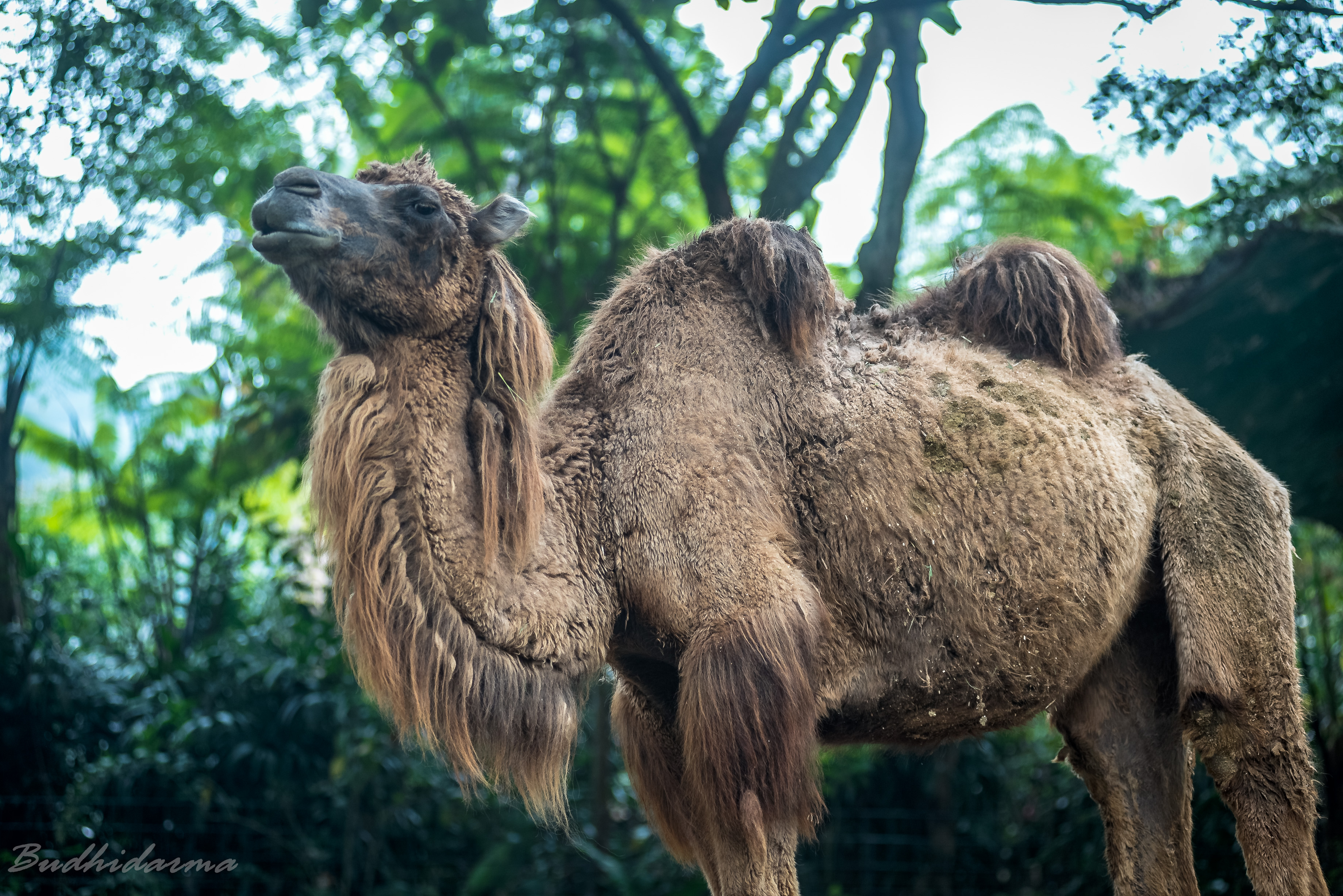
Bactrian camel

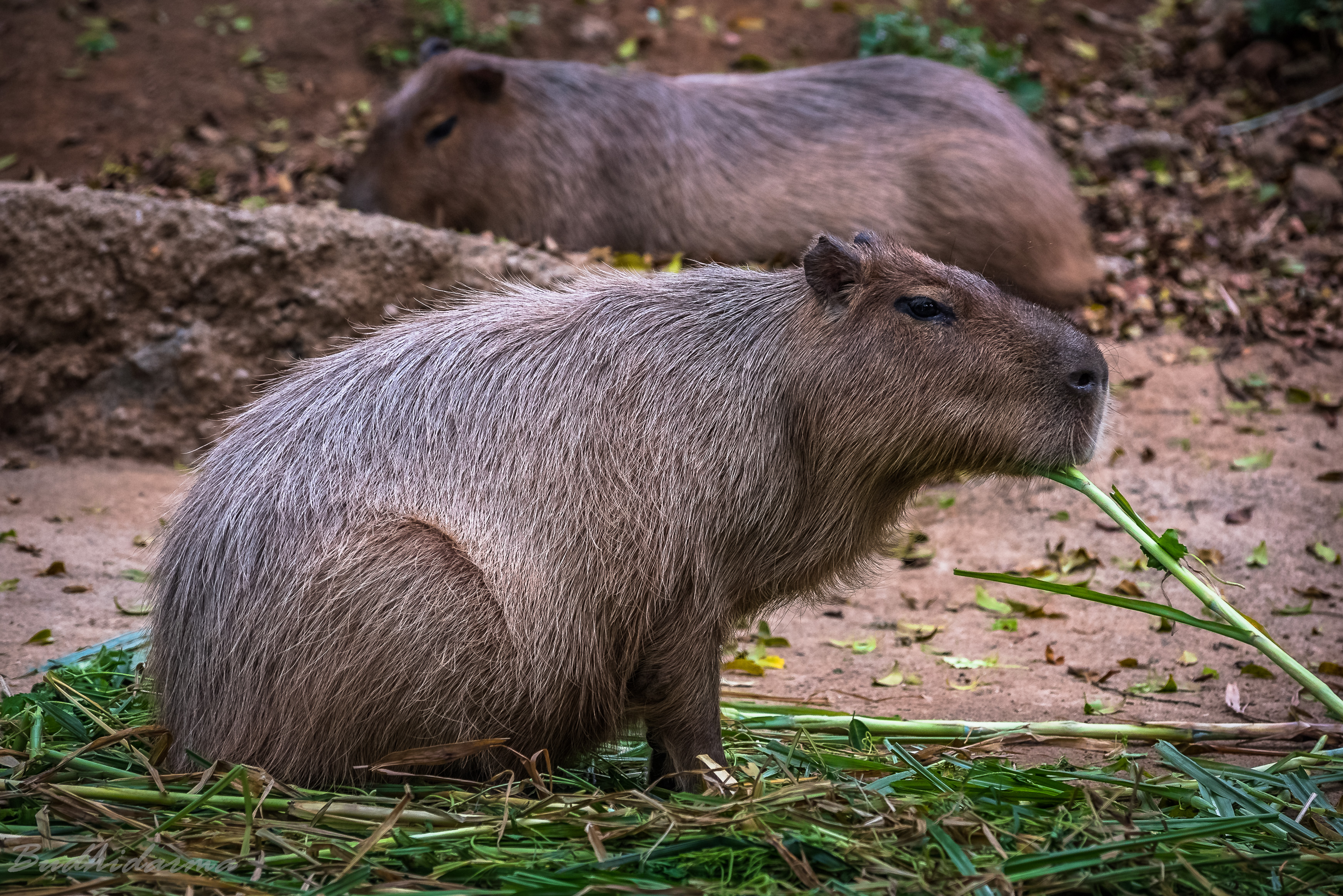
Capybara

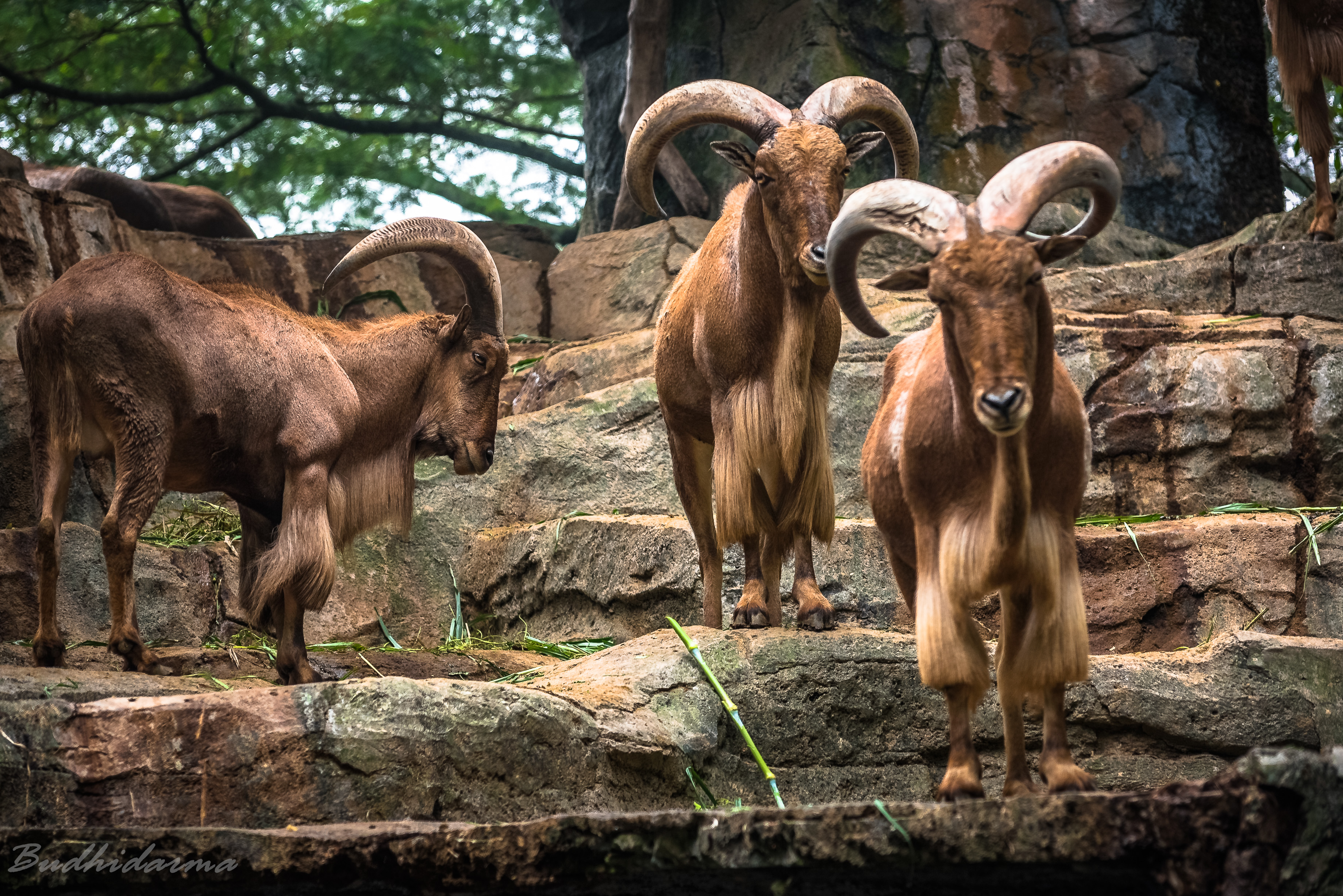
Barbary sheep

== See also ==
- List of zoos
- List of amusement parks in Asia
