= Prigen =

District in Pasuruan Regency, East Java

- District of Indonesia
- Nickname: Tretes
- Interactive map of Prigen
- Coordinates: 7.6833°S 112.6167°E

Area
  - Total: 121.90 km^{2} (47.07 sq mi)

Population
  - Total: 90,372 (at mid 2,024)
- Website: prigen.pasuruankab.go.id

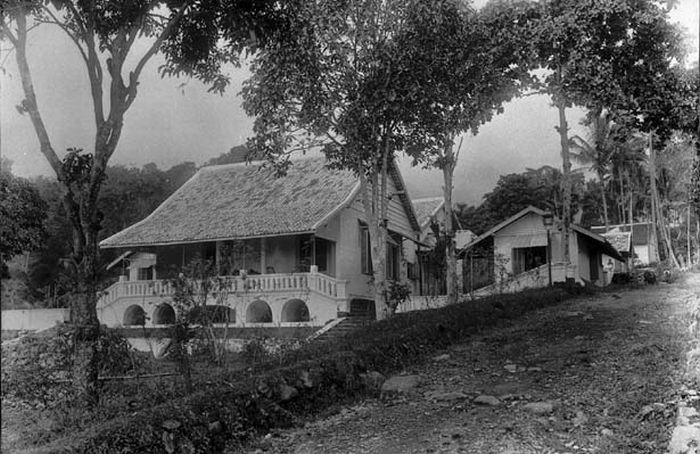
Hotel in Prigen at the base of the Arjuno volcano

Prigen (Javanese: Prigèn or called "Tretes") is an administrative district (kecamatan) in the western part of Pasuruan Regency of East Java, Indonesia. Southern and eastern portions of Prigen Regency are located between the slopes of the Arjuno volcano, Arjuno-Welirang volcanic complex and Mount Penanggungan. Taman Safari II is located in Prigen. It borders Mojokerto Regency to the west, Gempol District to the north, and Sukorejo District to the east, before forming a 400-metre border with Malang Regency at the peak of Mount Arjuna.

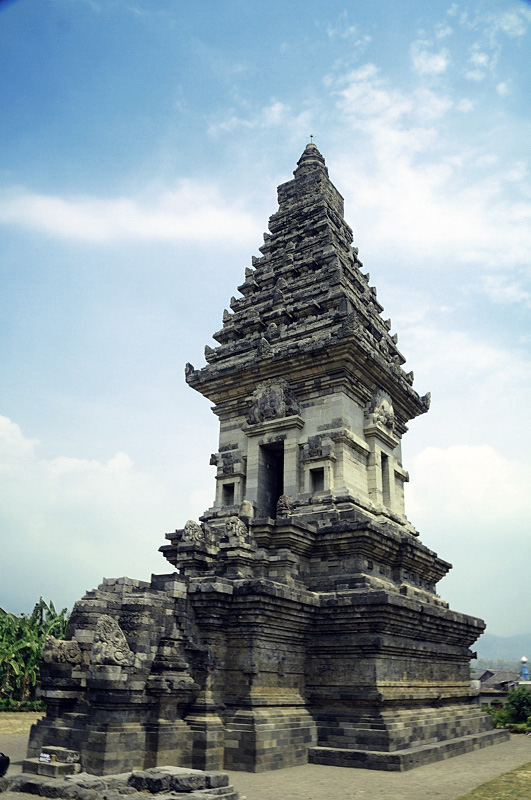
Syncretic Hindu-Buddhist Candi Jawi temple (candi) in Prigen district. The base is made of black stones, while the upper parts are made from white stones

The 13th century Candi Jawi (originally known as Jajawa) temple is located on the eastern slope of Mount Welirang outside Candi Wates village in the Prigen district. It is a syncretic Hindu-Buddhist temple (candi)

== Climate ==
Climate data for Prigen, Pasuruan (elevation 832 m (2,730 ft), 1991–2020 normals)
Month	Jan	Feb	Mar	Apr	May	Jun	Jul	Aug	Sep	Oct	Nov	Dec	Year
Record high °C (°F)	30.8 (87.4)	30.3 (86.5)	29.7 (85.5)	30.2 (86.4)	29.0 (84.2)	29.2 (84.6)	30.3 (86.5)	29.2 (84.6)	29.9 (85.8)	30.7 (87.3)	31.3 (88.3)	30.3 (86.5)	31.3 (88.3)
Mean daily maximum °C (°F)	26.2 (79.2)	26.3 (79.3)	26.6 (79.9)	26.8 (80.2)	26.7 (80.1)	26.4 (79.5)	26.1 (79.0)	26.2 (79.2)	27.3 (81.1)	28.0 (82.4)	27.7 (81.9)	26.5 (79.7)	26.7 (80.1)
Daily mean °C (°F)	21.9 (71.4)	21.9 (71.4)	22.1 (71.8)	22.4 (72.3)	22.5 (72.5)	22.0 (71.6)	21.4 (70.5)	21.6 (70.9)	22.5 (72.5)	23.3 (73.9)	23.2 (73.8)	22.3 (72.1)	22.3 (72.1)
Mean daily minimum °C (°F)	15.8 (60.4)	15.8 (60.4)	15.7 (60.3)	16.0 (60.8)	15.8 (60.4)	15.1 (59.2)	14.5 (58.1)	14.3 (57.7)	15.0 (59.0)	15.9 (60.6)	16.2 (61.2)	15.9 (60.6)	15.5 (59.9)
Record low °C (°F)	12.9 (55.2)	11.9 (53.4)	13.0 (55.4)	12.5 (54.5)	11.5 (52.7)	11.1 (52.0)	10.3 (50.5)	10.7 (51.3)	11.1 (52.0)	11.7 (53.1)	13.1 (55.6)	12.5 (54.5)	10.3 (50.5)
Average precipitation mm (inches)	556.6 (21.91)	520.0 (20.47)	472.7 (18.61)	370.3 (14.58)	222.3 (8.75)	129.1 (5.08)	62.5 (2.46)	39.0 (1.54)	27.8 (1.09)	79.9 (3.15)	256.1 (10.08)	468.2 (18.43)	3,204.5 (126.16)
Average precipitation days (≥ 1.0 mm)	25.6	23.8	23.1	19.2	14.3	10.1	7.7	5.0	3.9	7.3	13.9	21.6	175.5
Source: World Meteorological Organization
