= Cisarua =

- Town and District
- Location in Bogor Regency, Java and Indonesia Cisarua (Java) Cisarua (Indonesia)
- Coordinates: 6.680°S 106.932°E
- Country: Indonesia
- Province: West Java
- Regency: Bogor Regency

Area
  - Total: 71.32 km^{2} (27.54 sq mi)
- Elevation: 951 m (3,120 ft)
- Highest elevation: 3,019 m (9,905 ft)
- Lowest elevation: 550 m (1,800 ft)

Population (mid 2024 estimate)
  - Total: 136,841
  - Density: 1,919/km^{2} (4,969/sq mi)
- Time zone: UTC+7 (IWST)
- Area code: (+62) 251
- Vehicle registration: F
- Website: kecamatancisarua.bogorkab.go.id

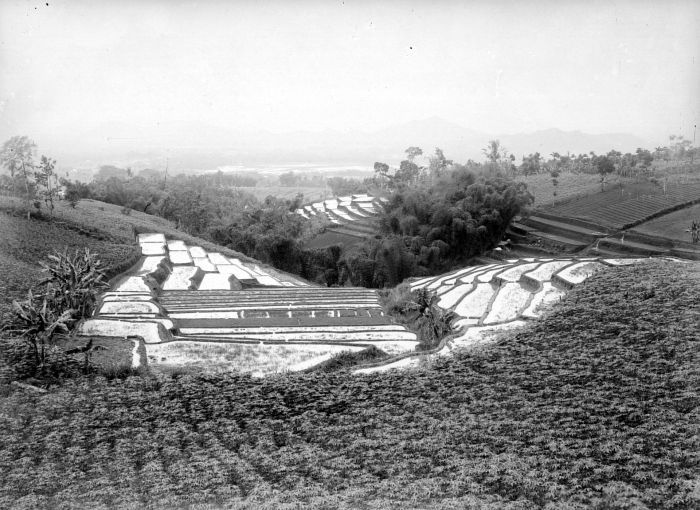
Cassava and terraced fields in Tjisaroea

Cisarua is a town and an administrative district (kecamatan) in the Bogor Regency, located in the province of West Java, Indonesia - not to be confused with districts of the same name in West Bandung Regency and Sumedang Regency. The district covers a land area of 71.32 km^{2}, and had a population of 112,655 at the 2010 Census and 127,096 at the 2020 Census; the official estimate as at mid 2024 was 136,841 (comprising 70,760 males and 66,081 females). The administrative centre is at Leuwimalang, and the district is sub-divided into the town (kelurahan) of Cisarua and nine rural villages (desa), all sharing the postcode of 16750, as set out below with their areas and their populations at mid 2024.

Kode Wilayah	Name of kelurahan or desa	Area in km^{2}	Population mid 2024 estimate
32.01.25.2005	Citeko	4.80	13,266
32.01.25.2003	Cibeureum	11.29	17,873
32.01.25.2006	Tugi Selatan	23.85	21,022
32.01.25.2009	Tugu Utara	17.03	12,307
32.01.25.2001	Batulayang	3.36	11,051
32.01.25.1010	Cisarua (town)	1.56	9,958
32.01.25.2008	Kopo	4.53	22,875
32.01.25.2007	Leuwimalang	1.36	8,067
32.01.25.2002	Jogjogan	1.54	9,749
32.01.25.2004	Cilember	2.00	10,673
32.01.25	Totals	71.32	136,841

The district is known for its mild climate, tea fields, and extensive views, being located at a rather high altitude. Near the district is a mountain pass known for its villas and hostels, as well as a well-known "heritage" hotel known as the Puncak Pass, built in 1928.

Cisarua is also known due to the relatively high population of people of Middle East ethnic origin, and the use of Indonesian Arabic as well having a sizeable population of asylum seekers and refugees, mainly coming from Afghanistan and Pakistan, as well as ones coming from parts of Africa, primarily from Sudan, Egypt, and Somalia. The reason why many asylum seekers has sought refuge here is because of the relatively cool temperatures, as well as its location being close to the UNHCR offices in the capital Jakarta, which are located roughly about 72 kilometres north of the district.

== History ==
Back at the Dutch colonial era, the area was called "Tjisaroea", and between 1945 and 1949 Indonesian National Revolution the Royal Netherlands East Indies Army (KNIL) maintained a prison camp for soldiers convicted of breaches of military discipline.

The most well-known of those imprisoned there was Poncke Princen, who in 1947 served four months at the Tjisaroea Prison Camp on charges of desertion and later went over to the Indonesian National Armed Forces.

Cisarua District originally covered a larger area, but in 1997 the northern and western parts of the district were split off to create a new Megamendung District.

== Tourism ==
Tourism attractions around the area include Taman Safari, Telaga Warna and Melrimba Puncak.

Cisarua also attracts many tourists from the Middle East, including from Saudi Arabia, with reasons of coming similar to the ones with the asylum seekers. Because of the number of Arab migrants and tourists, the district is often called as the "Kampung Arab".
