= Jaksa Waterfall =

Waterfall in West Java, Indonesia

Jaksa Waterfall is a small waterfall in Bogor, West Java, Indonesia. Many tourists and visitors hike up the long pathway to reach this waterfall. It is located in a lowland rainforest near Taman Safari, a safari park. Jaksa Waterfall is 45.25 meters tall.

Nearby the waterfall, Amorphophallus titanum is known to grow.

== See also ==
- List of waterfalls
