= Megamendung =

- Town and District
- Location in Bogor Regency, Java and Indonesia Megamendung (Java) Megamendung (Indonesia)
- Coordinates: 6.650260°S 106.879847°E
- Country: Indonesia
- Province: West Java
- Regency: Bogor Regency
- Established: 14 August 1992

Area
  - Total: 52.58 km^{2} (20.30 sq mi)
- Elevation: 653 m (2,142 ft)

Population (mid 2024 estimate)
  - Total: 118,337
  - Density: 2,251/km^{2} (5,829/sq mi)
- Time zone: UTC+7 (IWST)
- Area code: (+62) 251
- Vehicle registration: F

Megamendung is a town and an administrative district (Indonesian: kecamatan) in the Bogor Regency, West Java, Indonesia. Adjoining with neighbouring Cisarua District (from parts of which it was created in 1997), the district is part of a cluster of tourist and leisure developments best known as the Puncak area. It lies 70 kilometres south from Jakarta, a few kilometres southeast of Bogor, and is considered a mountainous area.

The district covers an area of 52.58 km^{2}, and had a population of 96,887 at the 2010 Census and 107,137 at the 2020 Census; the official estimate as at mid 2024 was 118,337 (comprising 61,492 males and 56,845 females). The administrative centre is at the town of Sukamaju, and the district is sub-divided into twelve villages (desa), all sharing the postcode of 16770, as listed below with their areas and populations as at mid 2024.

Kode Wilayah	Name of kelurahan or desa	Area in km^{2}	Population mid 2024 estimate
32.01.26.2011	Sukaresmi	2.50	5,623
32.01.26.2008	Sukagalih	2.47	9,774
32.01.26.2002	Kuta	1.80	8,389
32.01.26.2004	Sukakarya	3.93	9,032
32.01.26.2007	Sukamanah	1.81	9,301
32.01.26.2001	Sukamaju	2.10	8,748
32.01.26.2010	Sukamahi	1.96	10,206
32.01.26.2003	Gadog	1.91	8,395
32.01.26.2006	Cipayung	3.71	17,406
32.01.26.2009	Cipayung Girang	3.25	11,304
32.01.26.2005	Megamendung (town)	22.56	8,079
32.01.26.2012	Pasir Angin	4.58	12,080
32.01.26	Totals	52.58	118,337

== History ==
Megamendung was created from what were formerly the northern and western parts of Cisarua District in 1997.

== Geography ==
Much of the district lies at an elevation of 500-600 metres, which moderates the temperature, and causing contrast to the heat of Greater Jakarta and other adjacent low-lying lands. Though much of the built-up area is not necessarily on rugged terrain, uneven ground is the most common terrain as it stands sandwiched between mountains. The area is also close to Gunung Gede Pangrango National Park, where a portion of the park itself lies within district boundaries.

== Landmarks ==
Megamendung is most famed for its restaurant and factory outlets, where they have are often frequented by locals, daytrippers and visitors from Jakarta and around. Asides from said clusters, the district are also renowned for its variety of streams that flow down from nearby Mount Pangrango and surrounding mountains.

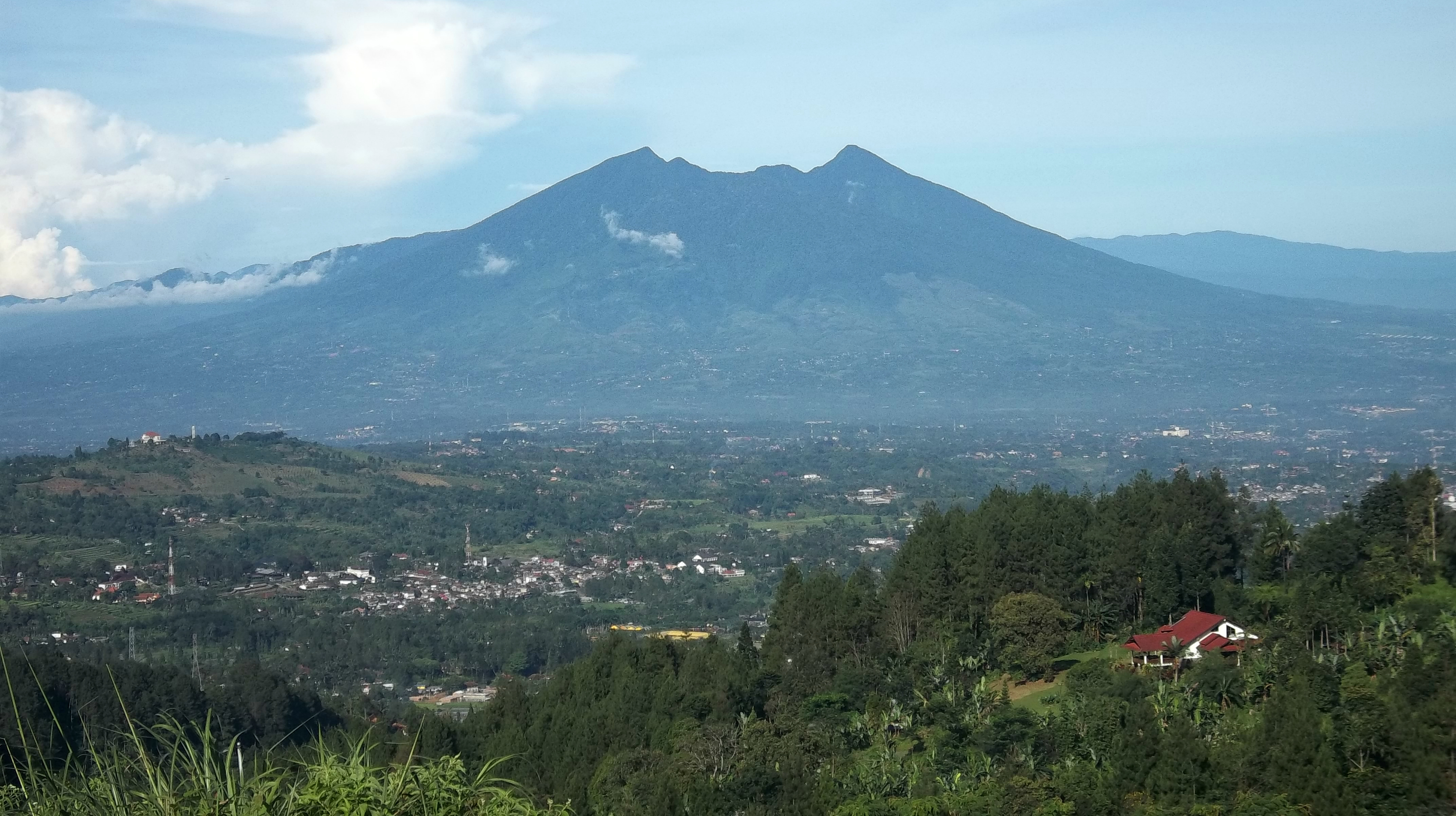
Mount Salak seen from Megamendung
