= Mount Penanggungan =

Stratovolcano in East-Java, Indonesia with sacred Hindu-Buddhist temples

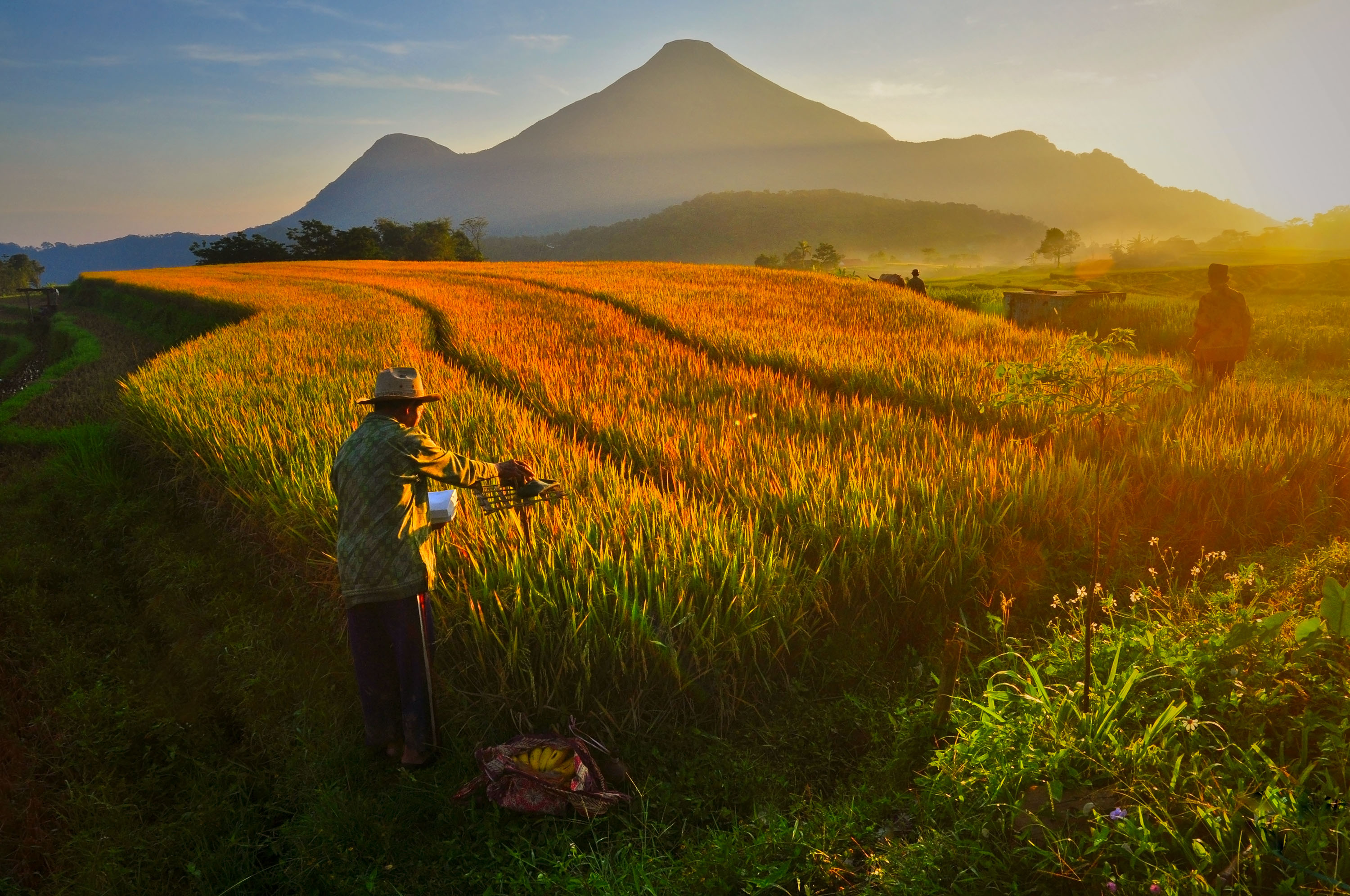
- Traditional Metik ritual in front of Mount Penanggungan, an ancestral rice harvest ceremony still practiced by farmers in Selotapak Village.

Highest point
- Elevation: 1,653 m (5,423 ft)
- Listing: Ribu
- Coordinates: 7.62°S 112.63°E

Naming
- Native name: Gunung Penanggungan (Indonesian)

Geography
- Location within Java Location within Indonesia
- Location: Java, Indonesia

Geology
- Rock age: Holocene
- Mountain type: Stratovolcano
- Volcanic arc: Sunda Arc
- Last eruption: Unknown

Mount Penanggungan (Indonesian: Gunung Penanggungan, literally "Mount of the Suspension" or "Burden-Bearing Mountain") is a small stratovolcano, immediately north of the Arjuno-Welirang volcanic complex in East Java province, Java island, Indonesia. Mount Penanggungan is about 40 kilometers (24.8 mi) south of Surabaya, and can be seen from there on a clear day. Several Hindu-Buddhist sanctuaries, sacred places and monuments are on the western slope of the mountain dating from AD 977–1511. Lava flows and pyroclastic deposits are around the volcano.

There are sub-peaks around Penanggungan, starting to the southeast from Mount Wangi (Gunung Wangi) at 970 meters above sea level, Mount Bekel Jolotundo elevated 1,200 meters ASL, a semi-freestanding peak to the northwest; Puncak Kemuncup rising to 1,200 meters on the eastern face, Puncak Sarah Klopo on the southwestern slope elevated 1,250 meters, Puncak Awang-Awang located about 1,275 meters up the southwestern side, and Puncak Garuda Penanggungan south of the main peak topographing 1,520 meters. Bayangan Hill, located on the southern face at 1,250 meters up, is the main tourist attraction and a scenic spot. The peak is in Mojokerto Regency, with a portion of the slope in Prigen, Pasuruan Regency.

== See also ==
- List of volcanoes in Indonesia
