= Mount Wilis =

Solitary volcanic massif in Java, Indonesia

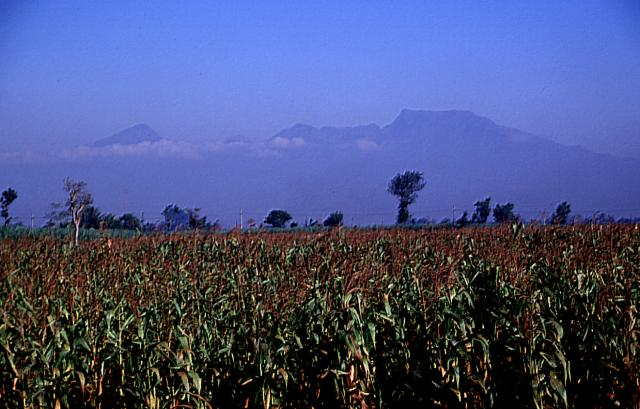
- Mount Wilis viewed from the west

Highest point
- Elevation: 2,563 m (8,409 ft)
- Coordinates: 7.808°S 111.758°E

Geography
- Location within Java Location within Indonesia
- Location: Java, Indonesia

Geology
- Rock age: ~700,000 years
- Mountain type: Stratovolcano
- Volcanic arc: Sunda Arc
- Last eruption: Pleistocene

Mount Wilis is a dormant solitary stratovolcano surrounded by low-elevation plains. It is located in East Java, Java island, Indonesia. Like most volcanoes along the Java trench, Mount Wilis is the result of subduction as the Indo-Australian plate subducts under the Sunda plate at around 6.7 cm/yr.

== Geology ==
While no eruptions have taken place in historic times, hot springs and warm ground water indicates that a magma chamber still exists beneath the volcano.

Mount Wilis is unique in that it has erupted many different types of magma. Lawu, another volcano ~70 km to the west, has erupted almost entirely andesite. Mount Wilis in contrast has erupted basalt, basaltic andesite, andesite, and dacite.

== Geothermal energy ==
Due to the vast amounts of hot springs and warm underground water near Wilis, there is the potential for geothermal power. Mount Wilis is a great location due to the fact there are no recorded eruptions in historic times, and an active geothermal system underground. It is thought that geothermal potential from Mount Wilis is between 50 MW from the 1015 MW potential total in East Java. This is enough power to light 15,000 houses in 5 separate regencies around the volcano. The occurrence of geothermal systems is detected by discharge of fluids, which included fumaroles, steaming from the ground, hydrothermal alterations, and hot springs.

== Images gallery ==
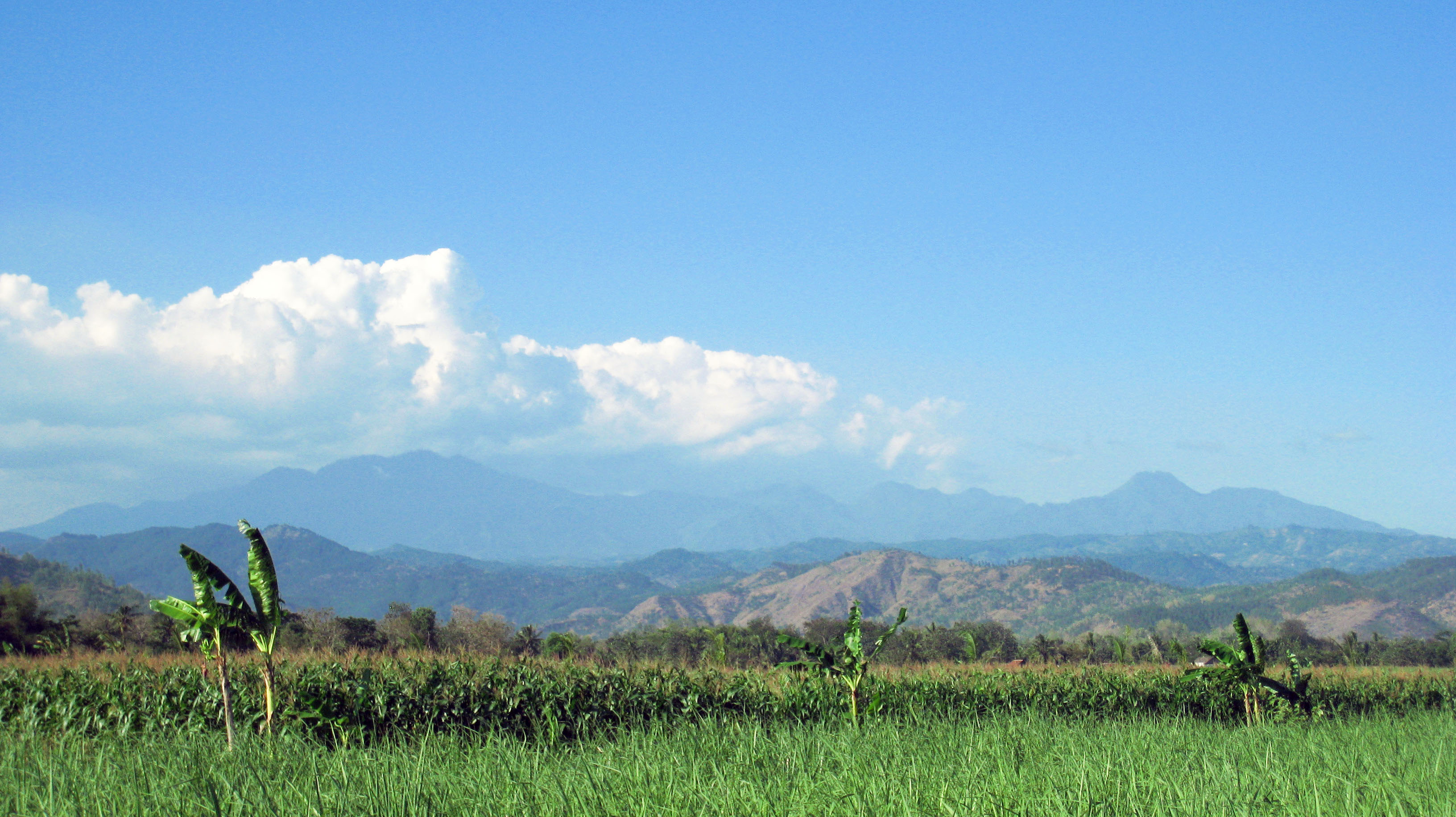
Mount Wilis viewed from Trenggalek, Indonesia

== See also ==
- List of volcanoes in Indonesia
- Argo Wilis
