= Arjuno-Welirang =

Stratovolcano in East Java, Indonesia

Arjuno‑Welirang
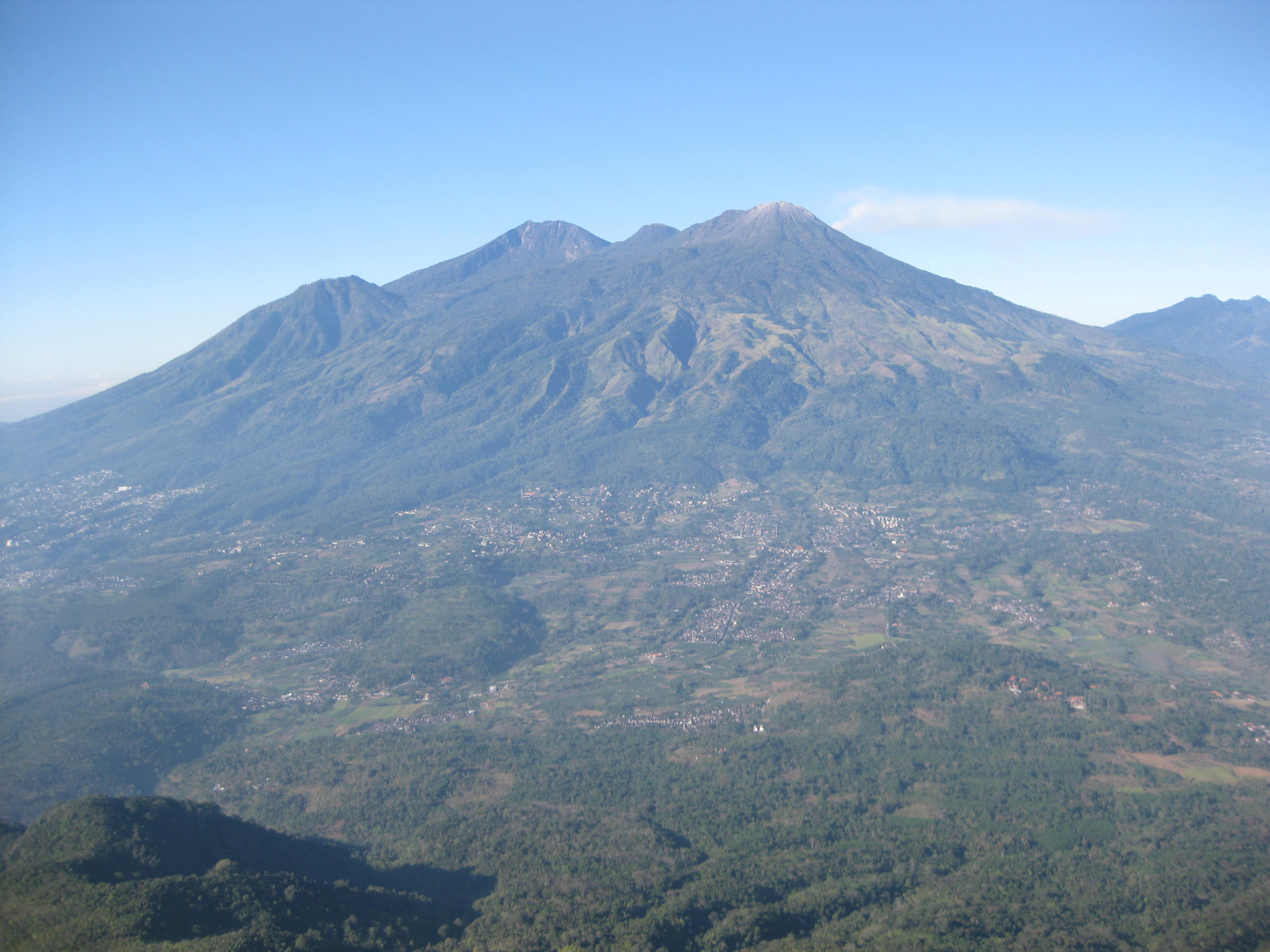
- Arjuno-Welirang, seen from Mount Penanggungan.

Highest point
- Elevation: 3,339 m (10,955 ft)(Arjuno); 3,156 m (10,354 ft) (Welirang)
- Prominence: 2,812 m (9,226 ft); Ranked 124th
- Listing: Ultra; Ribu
- Coordinates: 07°45′52″S 112°35′22″E

Geography
- Location within Java
- Location: Java, Indonesia

Geology
- Mountain type: stratovolcano
- Volcanic arc: Sunda Arc
- Last eruption: August 1952

Mount Arjuno-Welirang is a stratovolcano in the province of East Java in Java, Indonesia. Mount Arjuno-Welirang lies about 50 kilometers (31 mi) south of Surabaya, and 20 kilometers (12 mi) north of Malang. It is a twin volcano, with the 'twins' being Arjuno and Welirang. There is at least one other stratovolcano in the area, and around 10 pyroclastic cones nearby. They are located in a 6 km line between Arjuno and Welirang. The Arjuno-Welirang volcanic complex itself lies in the older two volcanoes, Mount Ringgit to the east and Mount Linting to the south. The summit lacks vegetation. Fumarolic areas with sulfur deposits are found in several locations in Welirang.

The name Arjuno is a Javanese rendition of Arjuna, a hero in the Mahabharata epic, while Welirang is the Javanese word for sulfur.

A 1950 eruption was measured at VEI=2 in terms of explosiveness. There was an explosive eruption. Another eruption occurred two years later in 1952. This eruption was measured at VEI=0.

A 300 hectare slope of Mount Arjuno near the road of Surabaya-Malang is used by Taman Safari II.

== Gallery ==
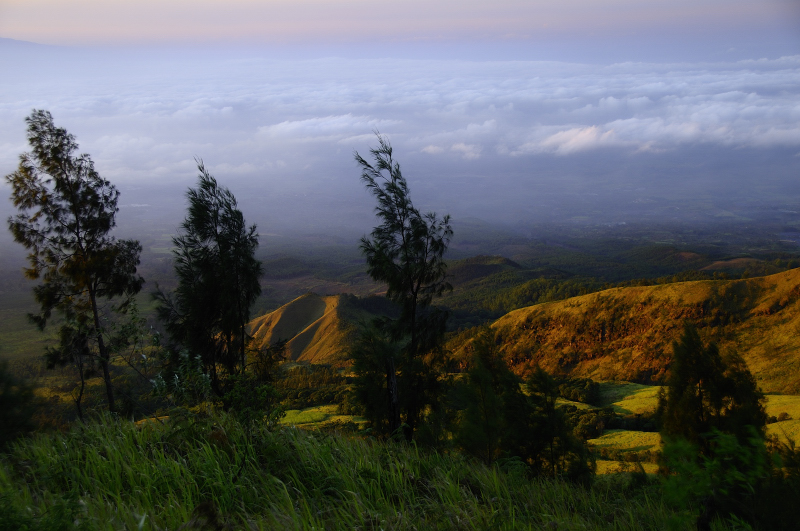

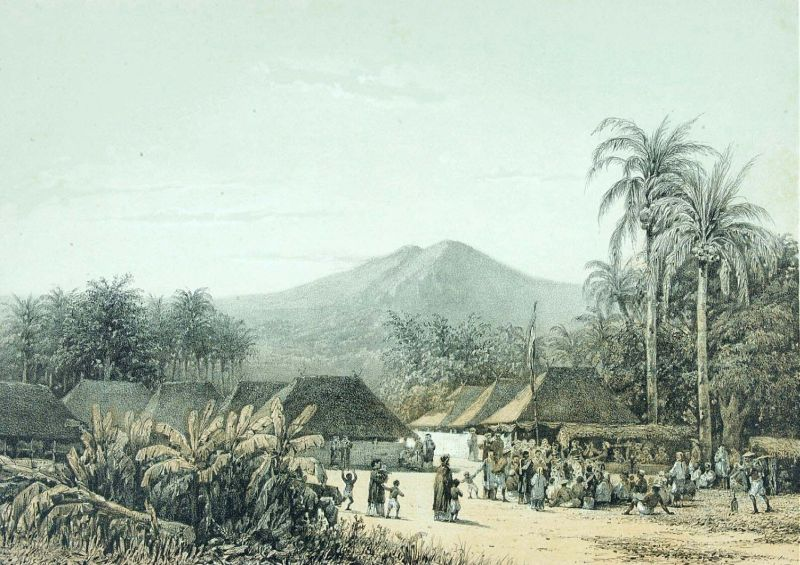

== See also ==
- List of ultras of the Malay Archipelago
- List of volcanoes in Indonesia
