= List of individual giant pandas =

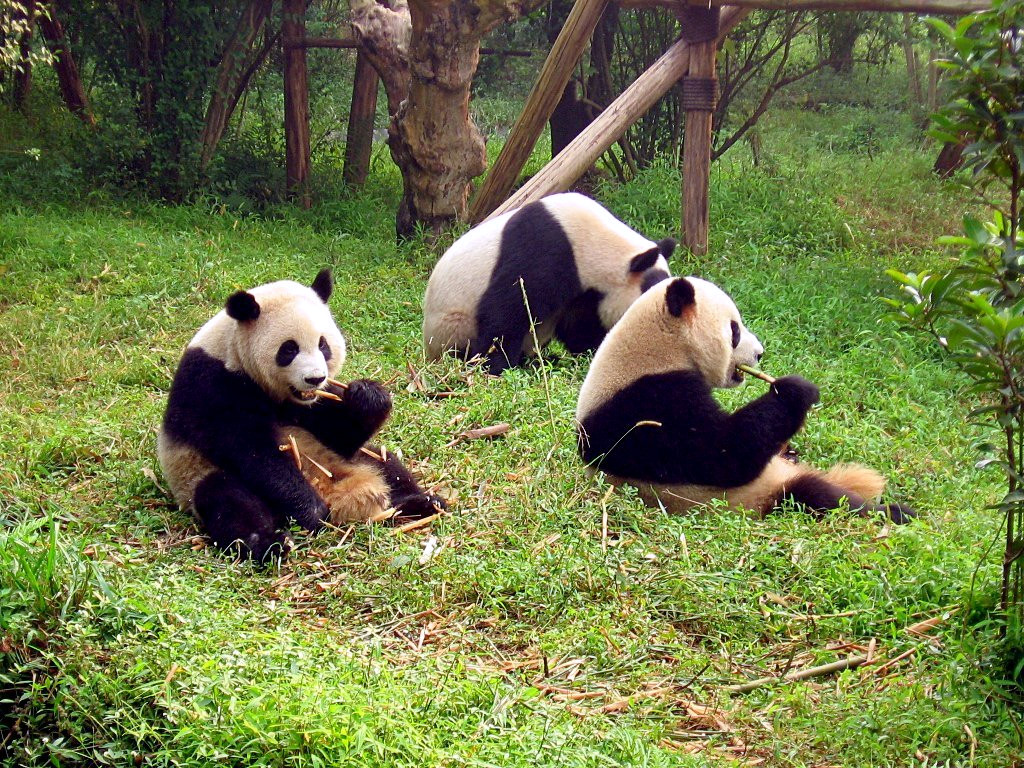
Adults, 2005?

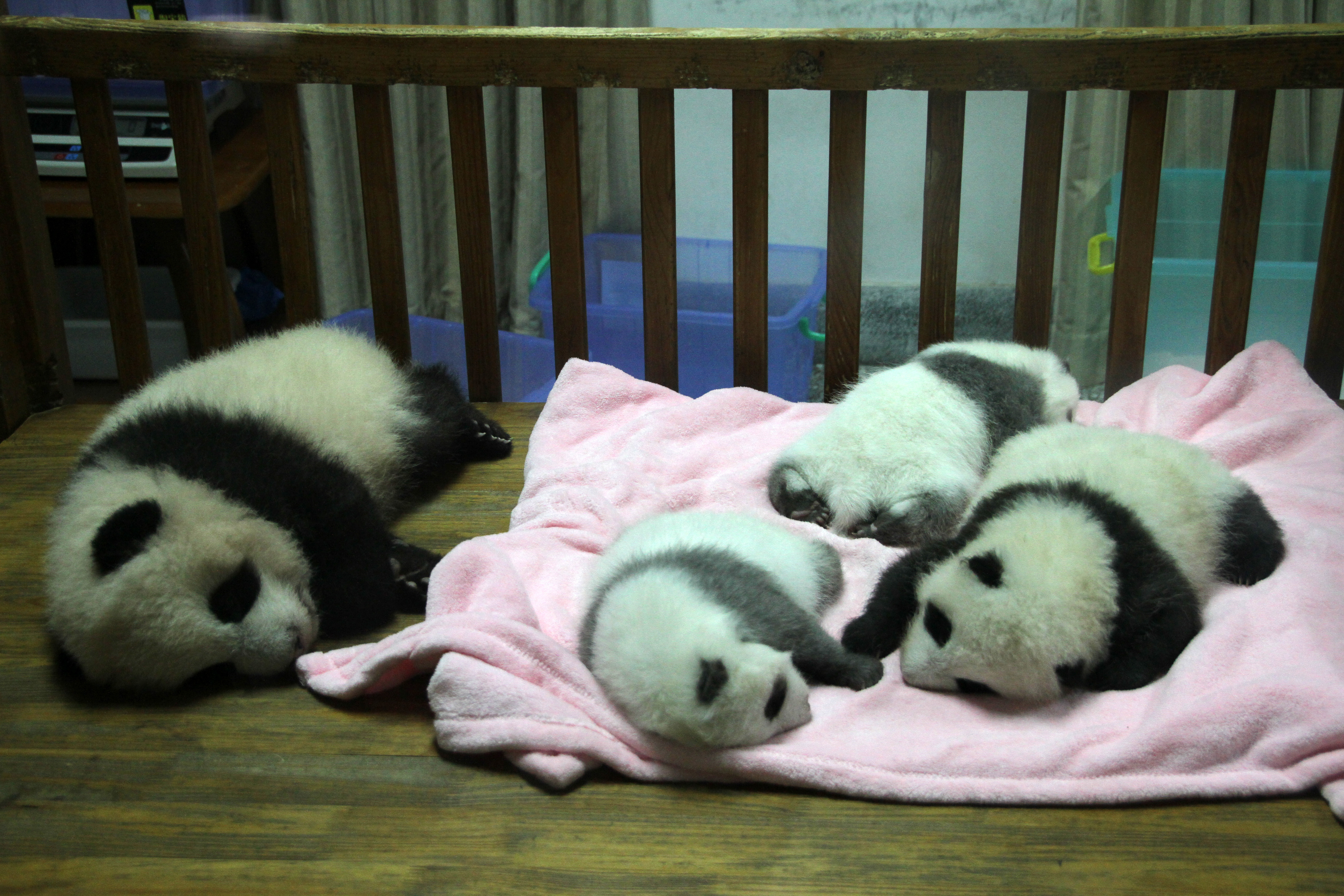
Cubs, 2012

Pandas at the Chengdu Research Base of Giant Panda Breeding

The giant panda (Ailuropoda melanoleuca), also known as the panda bear or simply panda, is a bear species endemic to China, with a white coat colored black patches around its eyes, ears, and limbs. It is a conservation-reliant vulnerable species. Wild population estimates of the bear vary; one estimate shows that there are about 1,590 individuals living in the wild, while a 2006 study via DNA analysis estimated that this figure could be as high as 2,000 to 3,000.

As of 27 September 2026, there are 21 zoos and parks in 16 countries and 3 area(s) outside of mainland China (Australia, Austria, Belgium, Denmark, France, Germany, Indonesia, Malaysia, Mexico, the Netherlands, Qatar, Singapore, South Korea, Spain, Russia, and the United States, and Hong Kong, Macau, and Taiwan) that have giant pandas. These zoos have contracts with China to house these pandas for up to 10 years. Exceptions include some of the pandas held at Ocean Park Hong Kong; the three pandas held at Taipei Zoo, which are given by China; and one panda held in Mexico. Giant pandas are on the IUCN Red List so part of the reason these contracts exist between China and international zoos is to try to help the species reproduce before they are brought back to their native land. For this reason, pandas are treated very well.

== Living giant pandas ==
Living giant pandas, with relevant details
Name (sex)	Date and place of birth	Relatives (Note: Parents, siblings, and half-siblings)	Residence(s) (Note: To avoid redundancy, this section should not include their place of birth unless they returned to it.)	Mate(s)	Offspring
Bai Yun (Note: Chinese: 白云; lit. 'White Cloud') (F)	7 September 1991 (age 35); Wolong National Nature Reserve	Dong Dong (mother); Pan Pan (father)	San Diego Zoo; Chengdu Research Base of Giant Panda Breeding	Shi Shi; Gao Gao	Hua Mei (F); Mei Sheng (M); Su Lin (F); Zhen Zhen (F); Yun Zi (M); Xiao Liwu (M)
Bao Bao (Note: Chinese: 宝宝; pinyin: Bǎobǎo) (F)	23 August 2013 (age 13); National Zoo	Mei Xiang (mother); Tian Tian (father); Bei Bei (M), Tai Shan (M), Xiao Qi Ji (M) (brothers)	Chengdu Research Base of Giant Panda Breeding; Wolong National Nature Reserve	Wu Yang	Bao Yuan (M); Bao Li (M); Dun Dun (F)
Bao Li (Note: simplified Chinese: 宝力; traditional Chinese: 寶力; pinyin: Bǎo Lì) (M)	4 August 2021 (age 5); Chengdu Research Base of Giant Panda Breeding	Bao Bao (mother); Wu Yang (father); Bao Yuan (M), Dun Dun (F) (siblings)	National Zoo	Qing Bao	—N/a
Bei Bei (Note: simplified Chinese: 贝贝; traditional Chinese: 貝貝; pinyin: Bèibèi; lit. 'treasure') (M)	22 August 2015 (age 11); National Zoo	Mei Xiang (mother); Tian Tian (father); Bao Bao (F), Tai Shan (M) and Xiao Qi Ji (M) (siblings); Unnamed twin cub	Chengdu Research Base of Giant Panda Breeding	—N/a	—N/a
Cai Tao (M)	4 August 2010 (age 16); Bifengxia Panda Base	Unknown	Taman Safari	Hu Chun	Satrio Wiratama
Da Mao (Note: Chinese: 大毛; pinyin: Dàmáo; trans. "First of Mao") (M)	1 September 2008 (age 18); Chengdu Research Base of Giant Panda Breeding	Mao Mao (mother); Yu Hin (father); Ping Ping (M), Mao Sun (F), Mao Tao (M), Mao Zhu (M) (siblings)	Toronto Zoo; Calgary Zoo; Chongqing Zoo	Er Shun	Jia Yueyue and Jia Panpan
Er Shun (Note: Chinese: 二顺; pinyin: Èr shùn; lit. 'Double Smoothness') (F)	10 August 2007 (age 19); Chongqing Zoo	Ya Ya (mother); Ling Ling (father)	Toronto Zoo; Calgary Zoo; Chongqing Zoo	Da Mao; Qing Qing	Jia Panpan and Yu Ke (sons); Jia Yueyue and Yu Ai (daughters)
Fu Bao (Note: Chinese: 福宝; pinyin: Fú bǎo, Korean: 푸바오) (F)	20 July 2020 (age 6); Everland, Yongin, South Korea	Ai Bao (mother); Le Bao (father); Rui Bao and Hui Bao (twin sisters)	Shenshuping Giant Panda Base, China	—N/a	—N/a
Fu Ni (Note: Chinese: 福妮; pinyin: Fú Nī; lit. 'Lucky Girl') (F)	23 August 2006 (age 20); Wolong National Nature Reserve	Long Xin (mother); Lu Lu (father); 12 full siblings; 44 half-siblings (through Lu Lu)	Adelaide Zoo	Wang Wang	—N/a
Fu Shuang (Note: Chinese: 福双; lit. 'Double Blessings') (F)	18 October 2020 (age 6); Chengdu Research Base of Giant Panda Breeding	Fu Lu (mother); Gong Zai (father)	Zoo Atlanta	Ping Ping	—N/a
Hua Mei (Note: simplified Chinese: 华美; traditional Chinese: 華美; pinyin: Huáměi; lit. 'flourishing and beautiful') (F)	21 August 1999 (age 27); San Diego Zoo	Bai Yun (mother); Shi Shi (father)	Wolong National Nature Reserve; Bifengxia Panda Base	Ling Ling; Qing Qing	10, including: Tuan Tuan (M); Wei Wei (M); Hua Long (M); Hua Ao (M); Mei Ling (F); Ting Ting (F)
Hu Chun (M)	8 September 2010 (age 16); Bifengxia Panda Base	Unknown	Taman Safari	Cai Tao	Satrio Wiratama
He Hua (Note: Chinese: 和花; pinyin: Héhuā) (F)	4 July 2020 (age 6); Chengdu Research Base of Giant Panda Breeding	Cheng Gong (mother); Mei Lan (father); He Ye (twin brother)	—N/a	—N/a	—N/a
Jia Panpan (Note: Chinese: 加盼盼; pinyin: Jiā pàn pàn; lit. 'Canadian Hope') (M)	13 October 2015 (age 11)	Er Shun (mother); Da Mao (father); Jia Yueyue (twin sister)	Toronto Zoo	—N/a	—N/a
Jia Yueyue (Note: Chinese: 加悅悅; pinyin: Jiā yuè yuè; lit. 'Canadian Joy') (F)	13 October 2015 (age 11)	Er Shun (mother); Da Mao (father); Jia Panpan (twin brother)	Toronto Zoo	—N/a	—N/a
Lin Bing (Note: Thai: หลินปิง, Chinese: 林冰) (F)	27 May 2009 (age 17); Chiang Mai Zoo, Chiang Mai, Thailand	Lin Hui (mother); Chuang Chuang (father)	Wolong National Nature Reserve	Yuan Yuan; Wu Gang	7 (Note: As of 2020)
Lun Lun (Note: Chinese: 伦伦; pinyin: Lún Lún) (F)	25 August 1997 (age 29); Chengdu Research Base of Giant Panda Breeding	Bing Bing (mother); Lin Nan (father)	Zoo Atlanta; Chengdu, Sichuan	Yang Yang	Mei Lan (M); Xi Lan (M); Po (F); Mei Lun (F); Mei Huan (F); Ya Lun and Xi Lun (F, twins)
Mei Lan (Note: simplified Chinese: 美兰; traditional Chinese: 美蘭; lit. 'Beautiful orchid') (M)	6 September 2006 (age 20); Zoo Atlanta	Lun Lun (mother); Yang Yang (father)	Chengdu Research Base of Giant Panda Breeding	Qi Fu; Meng Meng; Cheng Gong; Si Yuan; Xing Ya; Cheng Da	32, including: Xing Guang (M) and Xing Chen (F) (twins); Ji Mei (M) and Ji Lan (F) (twins); He Feng (M) and He Yu (F) (twins); Qi Qiao and Qi Xi (F, twins); Da Mei (F) and Cheng Lan (M); He Hua (F) and He Ye (M) (twins); Meng Lan (M)
Mei Sheng (Note: Chinese: 美生; pinyin: Měi shēng; lit. 'Beautiful Life') (M)	3 August 2003 (age 23); San Diego Zoo	Bai Yun (mother); Gao Gao (father)	Wolong National Nature Reserve; Bifengxia Panda Base; Chengdu Research Base of Giant Panda Breeding	Ying Ying	—N/a
Mei Xiang (Note: Chinese: 美香; pinyin: Měi Xiāng; lit. 'beautiful fragrance') (F)	22 July 1998 (age 28); Wolong National Nature Reserve	Lin Nan (mother); Xue Xue (father)	National Zoo	Tian Tian	Tai Shan (M); Bao Bao (F); Bei Bei (M); Xiao Qi Ji (M)
Ping Ping (Note: Chinese: 平平; lit. 'Peace Peace') (M)	17 March 2020 (age 6); Chengdu Research Base of Giant Panda Breeding	Mao Mao (mother); Xiong Bang (father); Da Mao (M), Mao Sun (F), Mao Tao (M), Mao Zhu (M) (siblings), An An (twin brother)	Zoo Atlanta	Fu Shuang	—N/a
Qi Zai (Note: Chinese: 七仔; pinyin: Qī Zǎi; lit. 'The Seventh Son') (M)	c. 2009 (age 16–17); Qinling Mountains	Unknown	Foping National Nature Reserve	An An	Rong Rong
Qing Bao (Note: simplified Chinese: 青宝; traditional Chinese: 青寶; pinyin: Qīng Bǎo) (F)	12 September 2021 (age 5); Chengdu Research Base of Giant Panda Breeding	Jia Mei (mother); Qing Qing (father); Qing Zai (brother)	National Zoo	Bao Li	—N/a
Ri Ri (Note: Japanese: 力力, romanized: Ri Ri; Chinese: 比力; pinyin: Bǐlì;) (M)	16 August 2005 (age 21); Chengdu Research Base of Giant Panda Breeding	Gong Zhu (mother); Ling Ling (father)	Ueno Zoo	Shin Shin	Hong Xi (M); Man Lan (F); Unnamed cub; Xiang Xiang (F); Xiao Xiao (M) and Lei Lei (F) (twins)
Satrio Wiratama (M)	27 November 2025 (age 11 months); Taman Safari	Hu Chun (mother); Cai Tao (father)	—N/a	—N/a	—N/a
Shin Shin (Note: Japanese: 真真, romanized: Shin Shin; Chinese: 仙女; pinyin: Xiānnǚ) (F)	3 July 2005 (age 21); Wolong National Nature Reserve	Ying Ying (mother); Lin Lin (father)	Ueno Zoo	Ri Ri	Unnamed cub; Xiang Xiang (F); Xiao Xiao (M) and Lei Lei (F) (twins)
Su Lin (Note: simplified Chinese: 苏琳; traditional Chinese: 蘇琳; pinyin: Sū lín; lit. 'A little bit of something very cute') (F)	2 August 2005 (age 21); San Diego Zoo	Bai Yun (mother); Gao Gao (father)	Bifengxia Panda Base	Wu Gang	Unknown
Tai Shan (Note: Chinese: 泰山; pinyin: Tài Shān; lit. 'peaceful mountain') (M)	9 July 2005 (age 21); National Zoo	Mei Xiang (mother); Tian Tian (father); Bao Bao (F), Bei Bei (M), Xiao Qi Ji (M) (siblings)	Bifengxia Panda Base; Chengdu Research Base of Giant Panda Breeding (Dujiangyan City base)	Wen Yu; Xiao Bai Tu; Ying Hua	Bai Feng; Xiao Jiu; Hua Bao
Tian Tian (Note: Chinese: 添添; pinyin: Tiān Tiān; lit. 'More and More') (M)	27 August 1997 (age 29); Wolong National Nature Reserve	Yong Ba (mother); Pan Pan (father)	National Zoo	Mei Xiang	Tai Shan (M); Bao Bao (F); Bei Bei (M); Xiao Qi Ji (M)
Tian Tian (Note: Chinese: 甜甜; pinyin: Tián Tián; lit. 'Sweet sweet') (F)	24 August 2003 (age 23); Beijing Zoo	Niu Niu (mother); Ying Ying (father)	Edinburgh Zoo; China	Yang Guang	Shen Wei (M) and Bo Si (F) (Note: Yang Guang was not the father.)
Wang Wang (Note: Chinese: 网网; pinyin: Wǎng Wǎng; lit. 'Net Net') (M)	31 August 2005 (age 21); Wolong National Nature Reserve	Mao Mao (mother)	Adelaide Zoo	Fu Ni	—N/a
Xi Lan (Note: simplified Chinese: 喜兰; traditional Chinese: 喜蘭; lit. 'Joyful orchid') (M)	30 August 2008 (age 18) (Note: Zoo Atlanta erroneously lists his birth date as April 30, 2008.); Zoo Atlanta	Lun Lun (mother); Yang Yang (father)	Chengdu Research Base of Giant Panda Breeding	Ni Ni	Ni Ke; Ni Na
Xiang Xiang (Note: Chinese: 香香; pinyin: Xiāng Xiāng; lit. 'Popular') (F)	12 June 2017 (age 9); Ueno Zoo, Tokyo, Japan	Shin Shin (mother); Ri Ri (father)	Bifengxia Panda Base; Ya'an, Sichuan	—N/a	—N/a
Xiao Liwu (Note: Chinese: 小礼物; pinyin: Xiǎo Lǐwù; lit. 'Little Gift') (M)	29 July 2012 (age 14); San Diego Zoo	Bai Yun (mother); Gao Gao (father)	Chengdu Research Base of Giant Panda Breeding; Jiuzhaigou	—N/a	—N/a
Xiao Qi Ji (Note: simplified Chinese: 小奇迹; traditional Chinese: 小奇蹟; pinyin: Xiǎo Qíjì; lit. 'little miracle') (M)	21 August 2020 (age 6); National Zoo	Mei Xiang (mother); Tian Tian (father)	Wolong National Nature Reserve	—N/a	—N/a
Xin Xin (Note: Chinese: 欣欣; pinyin: Xīnxīn; lit. 'Hope') (F)	1 July 1990 (age 36); Chapultepec Zoo	Tohui (mother); Chia Chia (father)	—N/a	Ling Ling	None
Yang Yang (Note: Chinese: 洋洋; pinyin: Yáng Yáng; lit. 'little sea') (M)	9 September 1997 (age 29); Chengdu Research Base of Giant Panda Breeding	Ya Ya (mother); Zhen Zhen (father)	Zoo Atlanta; Chengdu, Sichuan	Lun Lun	Mei Lan (M); Xi Lan (M); Po (F); Mei Lun (F); Mei Huan (F); Ya Lun and Xi Lun (F, twins)
Yuan Bao (Note: simplified Chinese: 圆宝; traditional Chinese: 圓寶; pinyin: Yuán bǎo; lit. 'Round baby') (F)	28 June 2020 (age 6); Taipei Zoo	Yuan Yuan (mother); Tuan Tuan (father)	—N/a	—N/a	—N/a
Yuan Yuan (Note: simplified Chinese: 圆圆; traditional Chinese: 圓圓; pinyin: Yuán Yuán) (F)	30 August 2004 (age 22); Wolong National Nature Reserve	Lei Lei (mother); Lin Lin (father)	Taipei Zoo	Tuan Tuan	Yuan Zai (F); Yuan Bao (F)
Yuan Zai (Note: Chinese: 圓仔; pinyin: Yuánzǎi; Pe̍h-ōe-jī: Îⁿ-á) (F)	6 July 2013 (age 13); Taipei Zoo	Yuan Yuan (mother); Tuan Tuan (father); Yuan Bao (F) (sister)	—N/a	—N/a	—N/a
Yun Zi (Note: Chinese: 云子; pinyin: Yún zǐ; lit. 'Son of Cloud') (M)	5 August 2009 (age 17); San Diego Zoo	Bai Yun (mother); Gao Gao (father); Hua Mei (half-sister); Mei Sheng (M), Xiao Liwu (M), Su Lin (F), Zhen Zhen (F) (siblings)	Dujiangyan City; Shijiazhuang Zoo; Chengdu Research Base of Giant Panda Breeding	—N/a	—N/a
Zhen Zhen (Note: Chinese: 珍珍; pinyin: Zhēn zhēn; lit. 'Precious') (F)	3 August 2007 (age 19); San Diego Zoo	Bai Yun (mother); Gao Gao (father); Mei Sheng (M), Su Lin (F), Yun Zi (M), and Xiao Liwu (M) (siblings)	Bifengxia Panda Base	Lu Lu	4 (Note: two sets of twin cubs)

== Deceased giant pandas ==
Deceased giant pandas, with relevant details
Name (sex)	Date and place of birth	Relatives	Residence(s)	Date, place of, and age at death	Mate(s)	Offspring
An An (Note: Chinese: 安安; pinyin: Ān Ān; lit. 'Peace peace') (M)	1986	Unknown	Ocean Park Hong Kong	21 July 2022 (aged 35); Ocean Park Hong Kong		
Basi (Note: Chinese: 巴斯; pinyin: Bāsī; trans. "Nice") (F)	1980; Baoxing County, Sichuan	Unknown	San Diego Zoo; Straits Giant Panda Research and Exchange Center, (Note: Better known as Fuzhou Panda World) Fuzhou, Fujian	13 September 2017 (aged 37); Fuzhou Panda World	Yuan Yuan	None
Chi Chi (Note: Chinese: 姬姬; pinyin: Jī Jī) (F)	1957; Sichuan, China		Beijing Zoo; Moscow Zoo; London Zoo	22 July 1972 (aged 14–15); London Zoo		
Chuang Chuang (Note: simplified Chinese: 创创; traditional Chinese: 創創; pinyin: Chuàng chuàng, Thai: ช่วงช่วง) (M)	6 August 2000; Wolong National Nature Reserve	Bai Xue (mother); Xin Xing (father)	Chiang Mai Zoo	16 September 2019 (aged 19); Chiang Mai Zoo	Lin Hui	Lin Bing
Gao Gao (Note: Chinese: 高高; lit. 'High High or Tall Tall') (M)	c. 1990			24 November 2025; Sichuan, China	Bai Yun	Mei Sheng; Su Lin; Zhen Zhen; Yun Zi; Xiao Liwu
Gu Gu (Note: Chinese: 古古; pinyin: Gǔ Gǔ) (M)	25 September 1999; Wolong National Nature Reserve	Tang Tang (mother); Pan Pan (father)	Beijing Zoo	16 January 2025 (aged 25); Beijing Zoo	Ying Hua	2
Jia Jia (Note: Chinese: 佳佳; lit. 'Good') (F)	28 July 1978; Qionglai Mountains	Unknown	Ocean Park Hong Kong	16 October 2016 (aged 38); Ocean Park Hong Kong	Unknown	6 (Note: An An was not the father.)
Kang Kang (Note: Chinese: 康康; pinyin: Kāng kāng) (M)	1970	Unknown	Ueno Zoo	30 June 1980 (aged 9–10); Ueno Zoo	Lan Lan; Huan Huan	None
Lan Lan (Note: Chinese: 兰兰; pinyin: Lán lán) (F)	1969	Unknown	Ueno Zoo	4 September 1979 (aged 9–10); Ueno Zoo	Kang Kang	None
Lin Hui (Note: Chinese: 林惠; pinyin: Lín huì, Thai: หลินฮุ่ย) (F)	28 September 2001; Wolong National Nature Reserve	Tang Tang (mother); Pan Pan (father)	Chiang Mai Zoo	19 April 2023 (aged 21); Chiang Mai Zoo	Chuang Chuang	Lin Bing
Ling Ling (Note: pinyin: Líng Líng) (M)	5 September 1985; Beijing Zoo		Ueno Zoo	30 April 2008	Tong Tong; Xin Xin	
Ling-Ling (Note: Chinese: 玲玲; lit. 'Darling Girl') (F) and Hsing-Hsing (Note: simplified Chinese: 兴兴; traditional Chinese: 興興; lit. 'Twinkling Star') (M)	Ling-Ling: 1970 Wilderness; Hsing-Hsing: 1971 Wilderness	Unknown	National Zoo	Ling-Ling: 30 December 1992 National Zoo; Hsing-Hsing: 28 November 1999 National Zoo	—N/a	5
Ming Ming (Note: Chinese: 明明; pinyin: Míngmíng; lit. 'Bright') (F)	1977			7 May 2011 (aged 34)		
Pan Pan (Note: Chinese: 盼盼; pinyin: Pàn pàn; lit. 'Hope Hope') (M)	c. 21 September 1985; Baoxing County, Sichuan	Unknown	Wolong National Nature Reserve	28 December 2016 (aged 31); Wolong National Nature Reserve (Dujiangyan branch)	Tang Tang	32, including: Bai Yun; Tian Tian; Lin Hui; Gu Gu
Shi Shi (Note: Chinese: 石石; pinyin: Shíshí; lit. 'Rock Rock') (M)	c. 1977	Unknown	San Diego Zoo; Guangzhou Zoo	5 July 2008; Guangzhou Zoo	Bai Yun	Hua Mei
Su Lin (Note: Chinese: 蘇琳; pinyin: Sūlín) (M)	1930s	Unknown		1938		
Taotao (Note: Chinese: 涛涛) (F)	c. 1972	Unknown	Jinan Zoo	2 April 2008; Jinan Zoo	Unknown	None
Tohui (Note: Chinese: 朵蔚; pinyin: Duǒ wèi) (F)	21 July 1981; Chapultepec Zoo	Ying Ying (mother); Pe Pe (father)	—N/a	16 November 1993	Chia Chia	Xin Xin (F)
Tuan Tuan (Note: simplified Chinese: 团团; traditional Chinese: 團團; pinyin: Tuán Tuán) (M)	1 September 2004; Wolong National Nature Reserve	Hua Mei (mother); Ling Ling (father)	Taipei Zoo	19 November 2022; Taipei Zoo	Yuan Yuan	Yuan Zai (F); Yuan Bao (F)
Xiang Xiang (Note: Chinese: 祥祥; pinyin: Xiáng Xiáng; lit. 'Auspicious') (M)	25 August 2001; Wolong National Nature Reserve	Fu Fu (twin brother)	—N/a	2007 (Note: Xiang Xiang was presumed to have been killed in January 2007, and his body was found on February 19, 2007.) (aged 5); Sichuan wilds	—N/a	—N/a

== Asia ==
The wild giant panda population in China is no longer endangered, with a population in the wild exceeding 1,800 according to the fourth wild giant panda population investigation. Around 75% of these pandas are found in Sichuan province, inhabiting 49 counties across Sichuan, Shaanxi, and Gansu provinces within a habitat area of 2.58 million hectares. To protect the wild population, China established 67 natural reserves for giant pandas, covering 53.8% of their habitat and 66.8% of the wild population. As of the end of 2020, there were 633 captive giant pandas, and 11 of them have been successfully reintroduced into the wild, with 9 surviving. These conservation efforts are crucial for the survival and long-term sustainability of the giant panda species.

=== Mainland China ===
Many zoos and breeding centers in China house giant pandas. These include:

- Bifengxia Panda Base, Ya'an, Sichuan – Home to Austrian-born Fu Long.
- Chengdu Research Base of Giant Panda Breeding, Chengdu, Sichuan – Home to Japanese-born Xiong Bang (M).
- Chime-Long Paradise, Guangzhou – The only three panda triplets in the world—Meng Meng, Shuai Shuai and Ku Ku—were born in July 2014.
- Dalian Forest Zoo – Home to Fei Yun (F), Cai Zhen (F) and Jin Hu (M) of Wolong origin.

=== Hong Kong ===
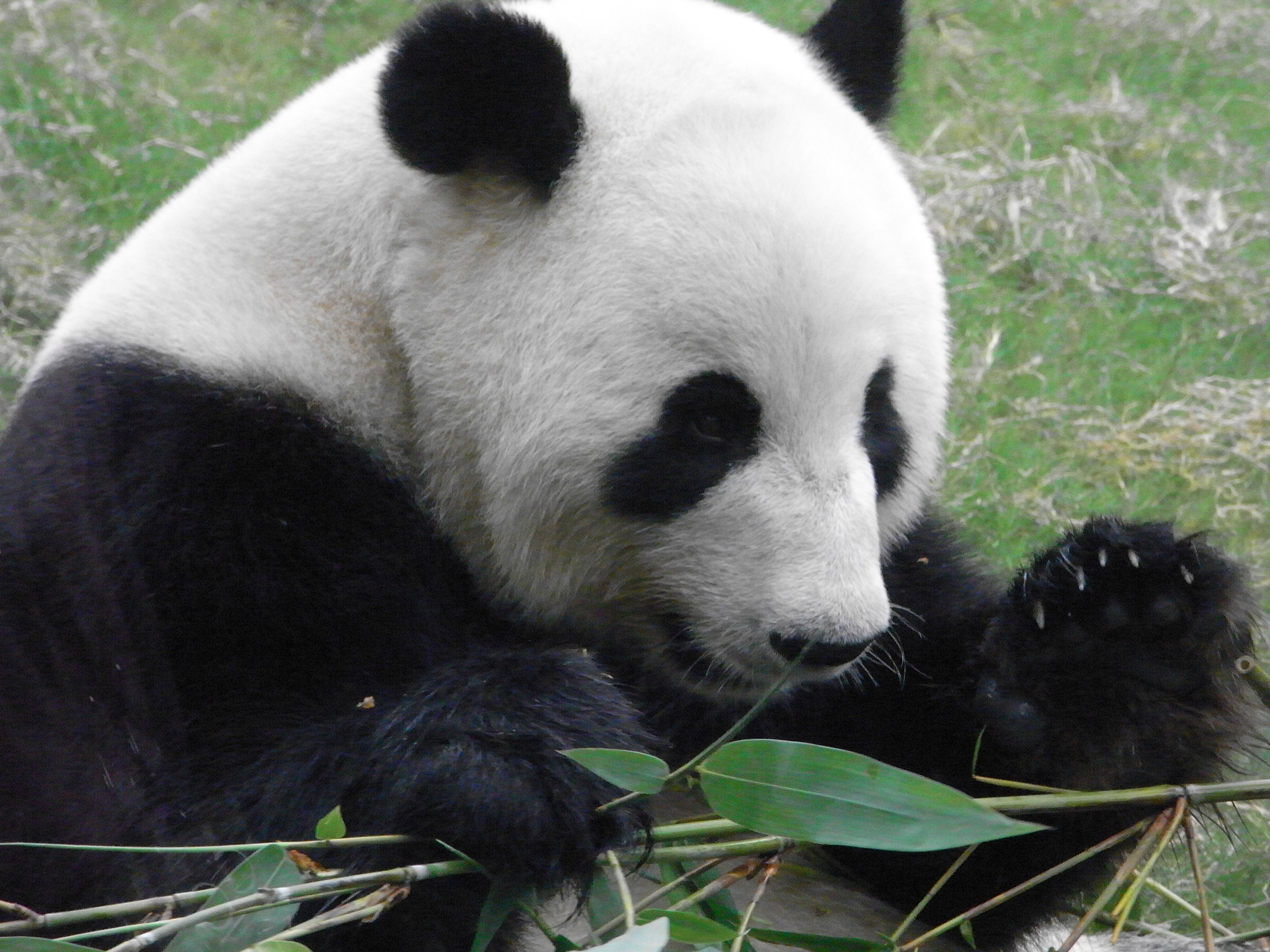
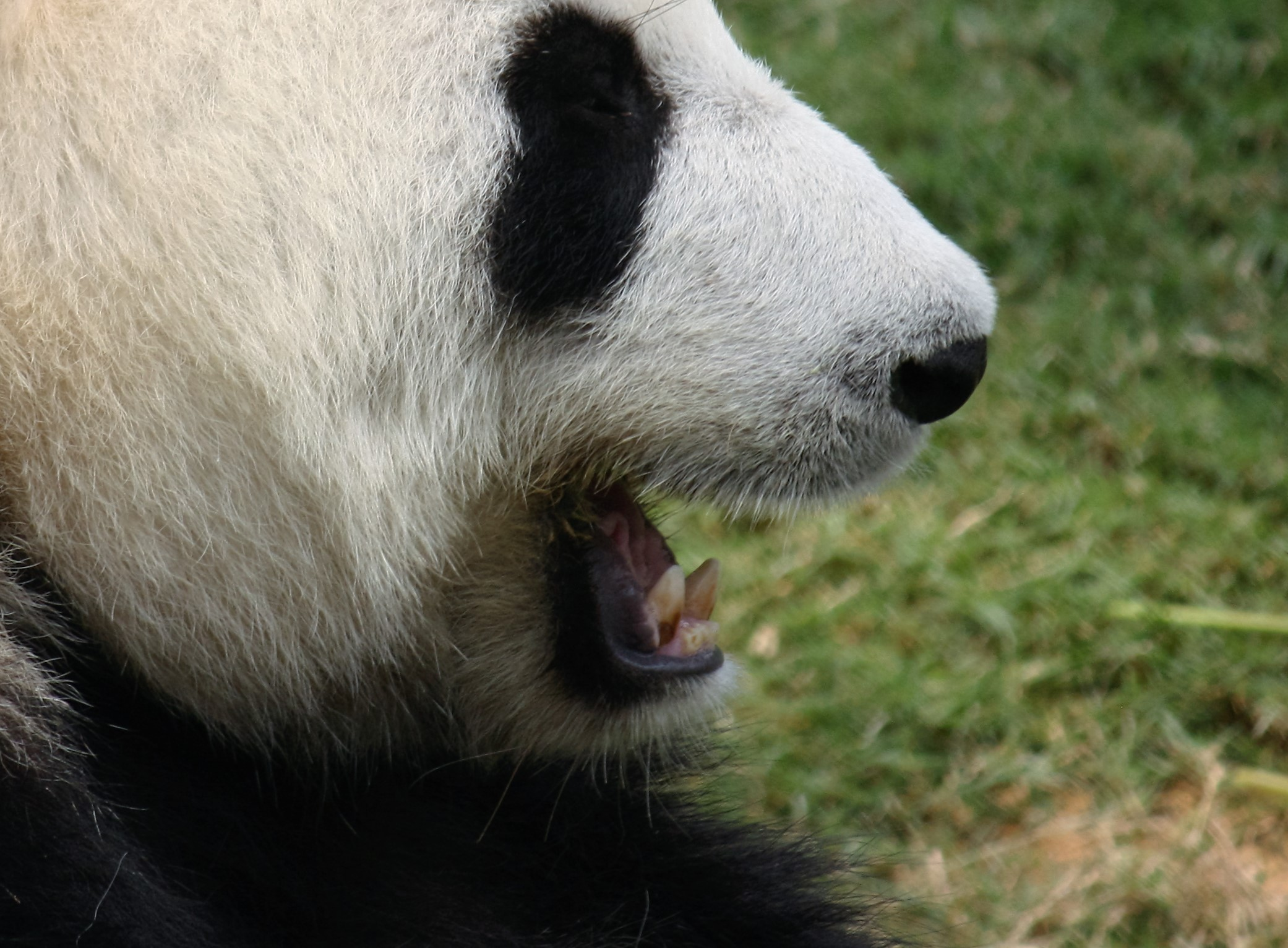
Pandas at Ocean Park Hong Kong

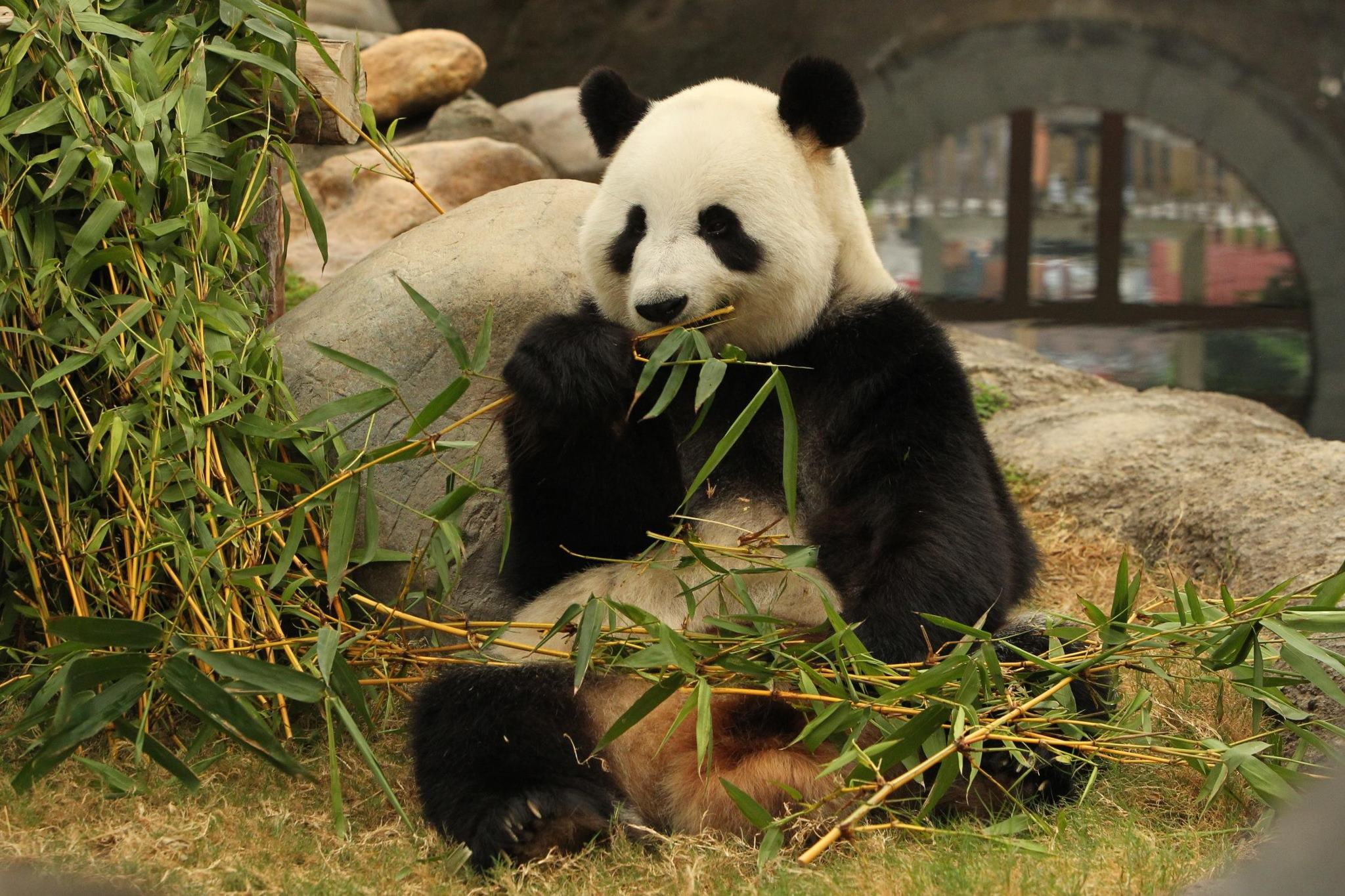
Giant panda Ying Ying at the "Amazing Asian Animals" attraction of Ocean Park

In April 2019, Ocean Park considered sending the 13-year-old panda pair Le Le and Ying Ying to the Wolong National Nature Reserve in Sichuan for mating, following poor success with reproduction since their arrival in the park. Ying Ying had previously been sent back there in 2015, where she soon became pregnant but later miscarried. She had three phantom pregnancies in the following years.

In April 2020, the panda pair mated with each other for the first time, at the age of 14. This was considered a breakthrough as male and female giant pandas become sexually mature at seven and five years old respectively. In August 2023, a team of experts from Sichuan arrived at Ocean Park to assist with the park's breeding efforts. On 15 August 2024, Ying Ying gave birth to naturally conceived twins, one female and one male, which were also the first giant pandas to be born in Hong Kong. This made Ying Ying the oldest recorded giant panda to have successfully given birth, at one day before her 19th birthday (equivalent to 57 human years). The pregnancy began when Ying Ying and Le Le naturally mated in March 2024, but was kept secret by the park until after the twins' delivery. The two panda cubs—especially the female—were said by the park to be "very fragile" post-delivery, and needed time to stabilise before being introduced to the public.

On 1 July 2024, it was announced that the Chinese government would gift a new pair of giant pandas to Ocean Park in the coming few months, to commemorate the 27th anniversary of Hong Kong's handover. The park first revealed that it was in discussions of requesting two more pandas back in May 2023.

=== Singapore ===
The largest panda exhibit built in Southeast Asia, this exhibit spans 1,500 m^{2} (16,000 sq ft). Simulating the bears' natural habitat with lush plantings, boulders, and water features, the state-of-the-art biodome is also temperature- and humidity-controlled to ensure the pandas' comfort. River Wonders (formerly River Safari) received two pandas, named Kai Kai and Jia Jia, on a 10 year loan in 2012. On 14 August 2021, Jia Jia successfully gave birth to a panda cub named Le Le.

=== South Korea ===
Ming Ming and Li Li were the first giant pandas to arrive in South Korea, having done so in 1994. Ai Bao (lovely treasure) and Le Bao (pleasant treasure) were sent by Chinese leader Xi Jinping to South Korea in 2016. The pandas and their family currently reside in 'Panda World' of Everland, a theme park in South Korea. South Korea's first natural twin cubs, Rui Bao (wise treasure) and Hui Bao (shining treasure) were born on 7 July 2023.

=== Japan ===
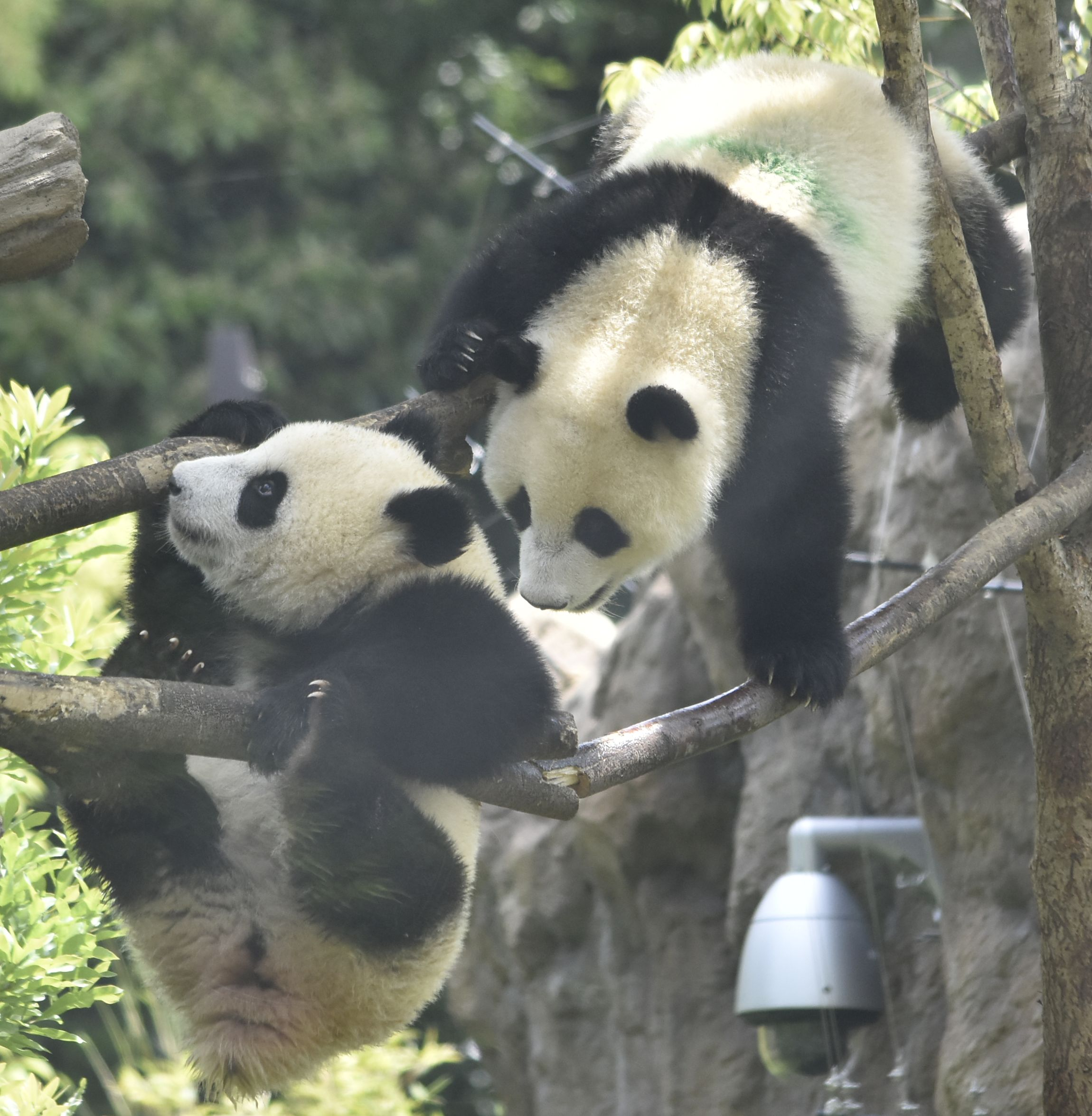
Xiao Xiao and Lei Lei at Ueno in 2022

Ueno Zoo, Tokyo – Xiao Xiao and Lei Lei, born in 2021, were scheduled to return to China at the end of January 2026.

Adventure World, Shirahama, Wakayama, Japan – Until 2025, it was home to Ei Mei (M), Mei Mei (F), Rau Hin (F), Ryu Hin and Syu Hin (M twins), and Kou Hin (M). In December 2006, twin cubs were born to Ei Mei and Mei Mei. Two cubs, Eiihin (M) and Meihin (F), were born to Rau Hin on 13 September 2008. Mei Mei, a mother of ten cubs, died on 15 October 2008.

Kobe Oji Zoo, Hyōgo, Japan – Home to Kou Kou (M), Tan Tan (F)

=== Malaysia ===
Feng Yi (known as Liang Liang) (F) and Fu Wa (known as Xing Xing) (M) were sent to Zoo Negara, Kuala Lumpur, Malaysia, on 21 May 2014 under the Giant Panda International Conservation Cooperation Agreement Programme. The agreement requires all giant panda cubs to be returned to China once they reach between 24 months and four years old. As of 2021, three panda cubs have been born in Zoo Negara—Nuan Nuan (born 18 August 2015), Yi Yi (born 14 January 2018) and Sheng Yi (born 31 May 2021).

== Europe ==
- Berlin Zoo, Germany — Bao Bao (1978–2012) and Tjen Tjen (died 1984) were the first two giant pandas in Germany. Bao Bao was the oldest known panda in zoos. The two pandas were given to West Germany by China in 1980. Between 1991 and 1993, Bao Bao was loaned to London Zoo. In 1995, back in his Berlin home, another female named Yan Yan (died 2007) was sent on loan from China in an attempt to mate Bao Bao. In spite of several artificial insemination experiments there were no offspring. In summer 2017, giant pandas returned to Berlin, when Jiao Qing and Meng Meng arrived on breeding loan from China. Meng Meng gave birth to two sets of twin panda cubs: one in September 2019 and the other in August 2024.
- ZooParc de Beauval, Saint-Aignan, Loir-et-Cher, France — home to Huan Huan (F) and Yuan Zi (M) since 15 January 2012. She gave birth to two cubs in 2017 but one survived, Yuan Meng. She gave birth to two additional cubs in 2021: Petite Neige and Fleur de Coton.
- Pairi Daiza, Cambron-Casteau, Belgium — home to Hao Hao (F) and Xing Hui (M) as of March 2025. They have been on loan from China since February or April 2014. Their first cub, Tian Bao (M) was born there on 2 June 2016, and twin cubs Bao Di (M) and Bao Mei (F) were born on 8 August 2019. On 10 December 2024, the Belgian-born pandas left for China. Hao Hao and Xing Hui are slated to remain on loan to Pairi Daiza until at least 2029.

== North America ==
=== United States ===
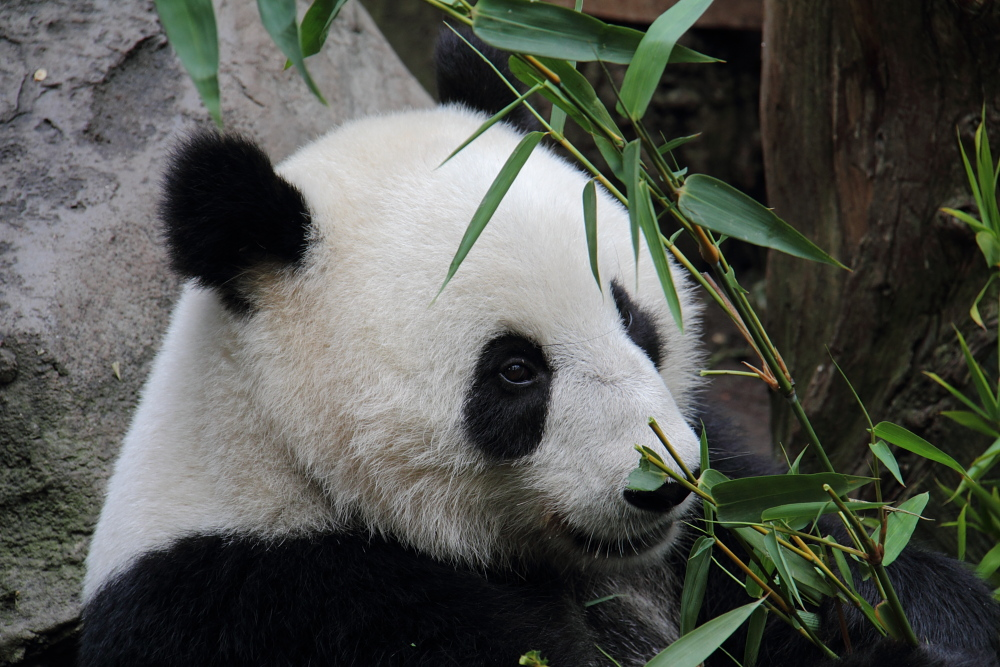
Panda at San Diego Zoo, 2009

==== Atlanta ====
Zoo Atlanta has hosted several giant pandas loaned from China. The loan fee that the zoo paid went towards the conservation of giant pandas. The zoo itself has given over ten million dollars for giant panda conservation. Their projects include infrastructure, research, and management. Zoo Atlanta's loan later expired in 2024 with the pandas making their return trip to China by October 2024. On September 27, 2026 a new set of pandas arrived at Zoo Atlanta named Ping Ping and Fu Shuang.

==== Memphis ====
In April 2003, the Memphis Zoo became one of four U.S. zoos to exhibit the giant panda on a long term loan basis. One male and one female giant panda (Ya Ya and Le Le) shared their 3-acre (1.2 ha) home with several other species native to China, in the first Memphis Zoo exhibit to be built as a zoogeographical exhibit. The buildings, plant life and even the sounds of China are represented in this $16 million exhibit. On 3 February 2023, the Memphis Zoo announced that Le Le had died at 25 years old. Ya Ya began the return journey to China, after twenty years at Memphis Zoo, in April 2023. Chinese social media users and activists had shown concerns over the panda's welfare and treatment.

==== Washington, D.C. ====
At the Smithsonian National Zoological Park, zookeepers provide various forms of enrichment to their giant pandas and switch up their routine. They provide honey, apples, and leaf-eater biscuits inside the panda toys. The toys are usually made of plastic, rubber, and bamboo to ensure that the pandas do not break the toys too easily. Giant pandas are allowed to play with water bottles, burlap bags, blankets, boxes, and "fruitsicles"—frozen fruit juice and water with cut-up fruit inside. The exhibit itself includes a room with a waterfall and rocky outcrop, a den, and several sustainable design features. There are green roofs, a solar hot water system, and natural material for the visitor paths. Not only is the exhibit sustainable, but it also creates an environment that allows for the pandas to stay at a cool temperature when it is hot outside while providing areas for privacy. Short trees, shrubs, pools, and streams, allow them to stay comfortable at all times.

The National Zoo has had 4 cubs: Tai Shan, Bao Bao and Bei Bei, who all live in China (Bei Bei was sent to China on 19 November 2019.) The fourth, born 21 August 2020 is named Xiao Qi Ji (Mandarin Chinese for "Little Miracle") born when his mother, Mei Xiang, was 22—the oldest female panda in North America to give birth. On 8 November 2023, the three pandas returned to China. On 15 October 2024, the zoo received two new pandas—Bao Li and Qing Bao—on a 10-year lease from China.

==== San Diego ====
The San Diego Zoo had giant pandas on-loan from China from 1996 to 2019 as part of the breeding program that successfully boosted the giant panda from "endangered" to "vulnerable." The agreement for the San Diego Zoo to house the breeding pair of Bai Yun and Xiao Liwu ended in 2019, and the pandas returned on 27 April 2019. In November 2023, General Secretary of the Chinese Communist Party Xi Jinping hinted at the return of giant pandas to the zoo as a "gesture that China is ready to continue cooperation with the U.S. on panda conservation." In 2024, the San Diego Zoo signed another agreement to keep pandas on-loan from China, and on 28 June 2024, the breeding pair Yun Chuan and Xin Bao arrived at the zoo, becoming the first pandas to be sent to the United States in 21 years.

==== Other ====
Other American zoos have hosted giant pandas on more limited basis prior to the requirement for long term periods of at least 10 years. Columbus Zoo and Toledo Zoo hosted pandas in 1992 and 1988, respectively.

=== Mexico ===
The Chapultepec Zoo (Zoológico de Chapultepec) is one of the four zoos of Mexico City, and it is especially famous for its success in giant panda breeding; in 1980 Chapultepec Zoo became the first institution outside of China to successfully breed the previously endangered species in captivity. The first bear born, Xeng-Li, lived only eight days after its 10 August birth but was accidentally smothered by its mother, Yin-Yin.

In total, there have been eight live births at the zoo. The most famous panda to have lived at the zoo is Tohui (1981–1993). As of November 2019, the two female giant pandas who live at the zoo, Shuan Shuan (b. 1988) and Xin Xin (b. 1990), are the oldest Giant Pandas in captivity. Shuan Shuan died in 2022, leaving Xin Xin as the last surviving panda in Mexico.

The pandas at Chapultepec are special in that China does not have ownership. The original pair was given to Mexico and subsequent pandas have all been born prior to the change in policy from gifting to loaning. Zoo officials have also come to an agreement with China that any new offspring born at Chapultepec will belong to China. However, these pandas will be allowed to stay at the zoo (in contrast to other institutions, where offspring have to be returned to China after reaching five years of age).

Home to Xiu Hua (F), born on 25 June 1985, and Shuan Shuan (F), born on 15 June 1987.

=== Canada ===
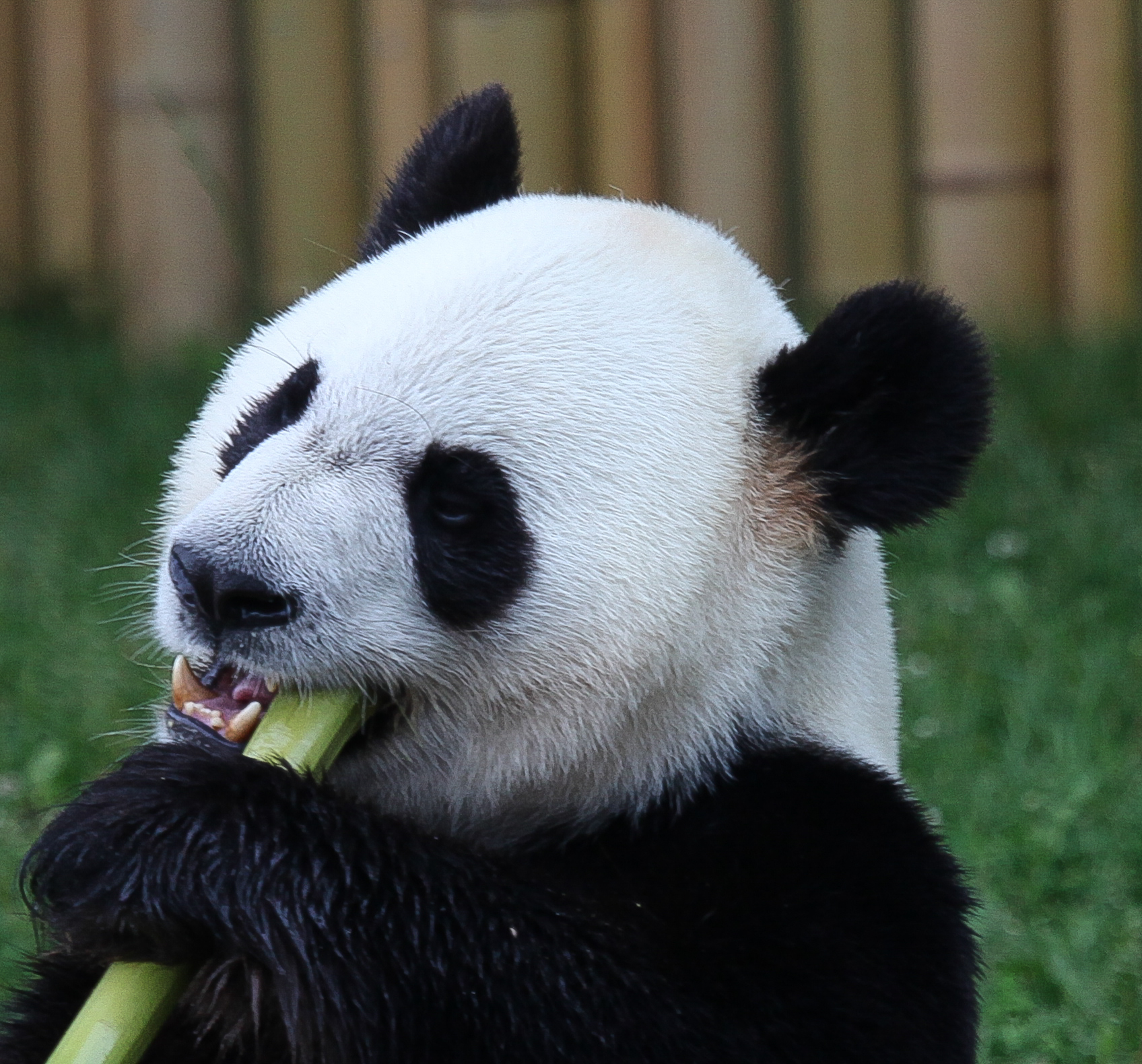
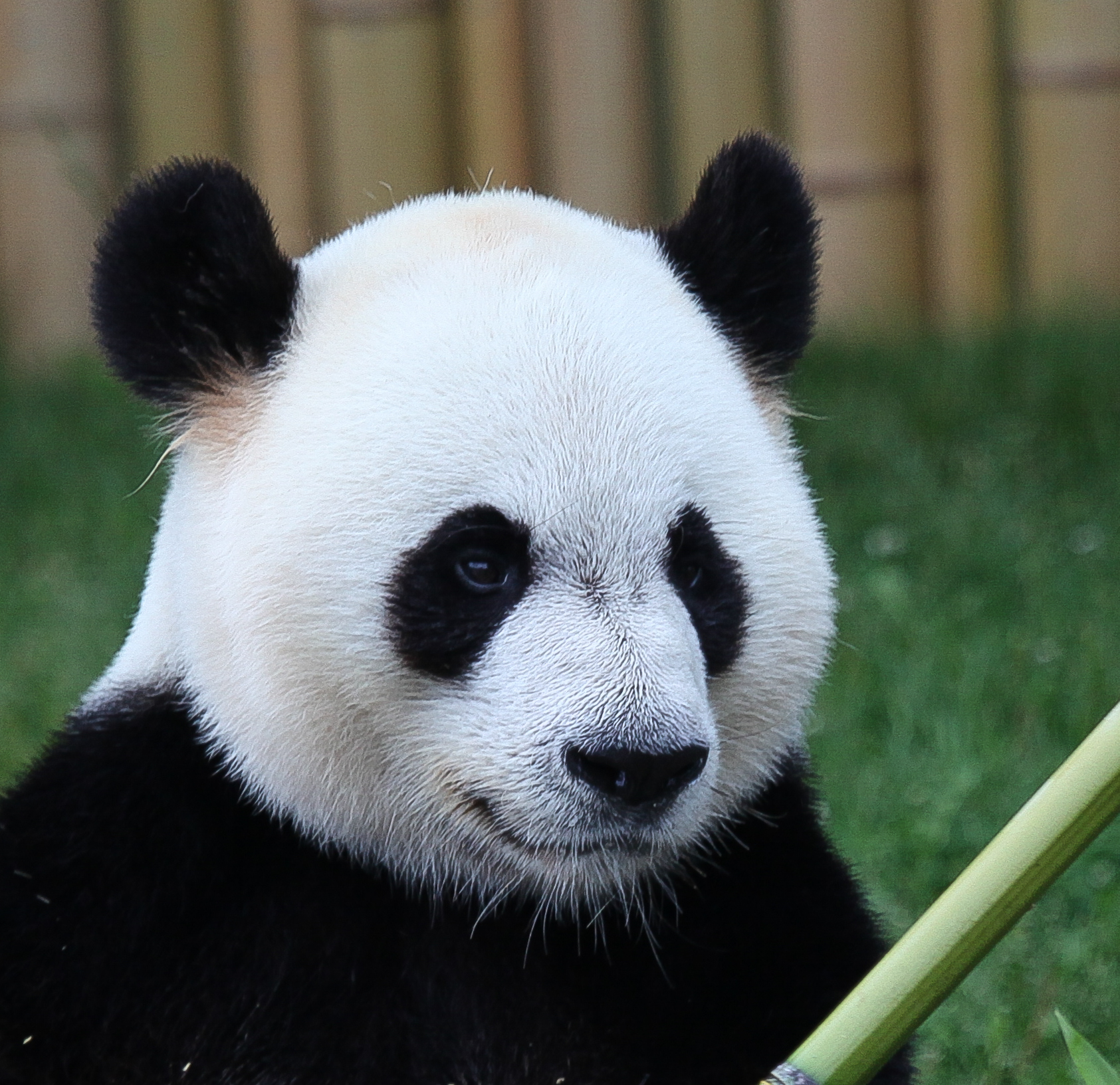
Toronto Zoo

Giant pandas Jia Yueyue and Jia Panpan were born to Er Shun and Da Mao at Toronto Zoo in Ontario. The twins were then relocated to the Calgary Zoo in Alberta in March 2018. They were relocated to China in 2020 due to a bamboo shortage caused by supply chain issues after moving to the Calgary Zoo. Prior to Jia Yueyue and Jia Panpan, the Assiniboine Park Zoo hosted the giant pandas Rong Rong and Chuan Chuan in the 1980s.

== Oceania ==
=== Australia ===
Adelaide Zoo in Australia was home to the Southern Hemisphere's only giant panda pair when its "Bamboo Forest" exhibit opened in 2009—a distinction it held for more than a decade. The zoo remains the largest panda facility in the region and is currently home to two giant pandas, Xing Qiu and Yi Lan, who live together as a male–female pair. They share the habitat with two red pandas named Ravi and Mishry.

With South Australia's warmer climate, the exhibit's landscape and systems were carefully designed to replicate the lush, temperate bamboo forests of Sichuan province in China. The 3,000 m^{2} (32,000 sq ft) enclosure includes advanced climate-control systems to maintain cool, humid conditions suitable for pandas, along with landscaped rock formations, water features, and native Chinese vegetation for enrichment. Indoor dens and natural caves provide comfort year-round. Dedicated keepers and veterinary staff oversee the welfare of both panda species.

In recent years, Adelaide Zoo is no longer the only panda-holding institution in the Southern Hemisphere, as new panda facilities have since opened in Indonesia.

== See also ==
- Endangered species
- Wildlife of China
- List of individual bears
