= Yun Zi =

Male giant panda (born 2009)

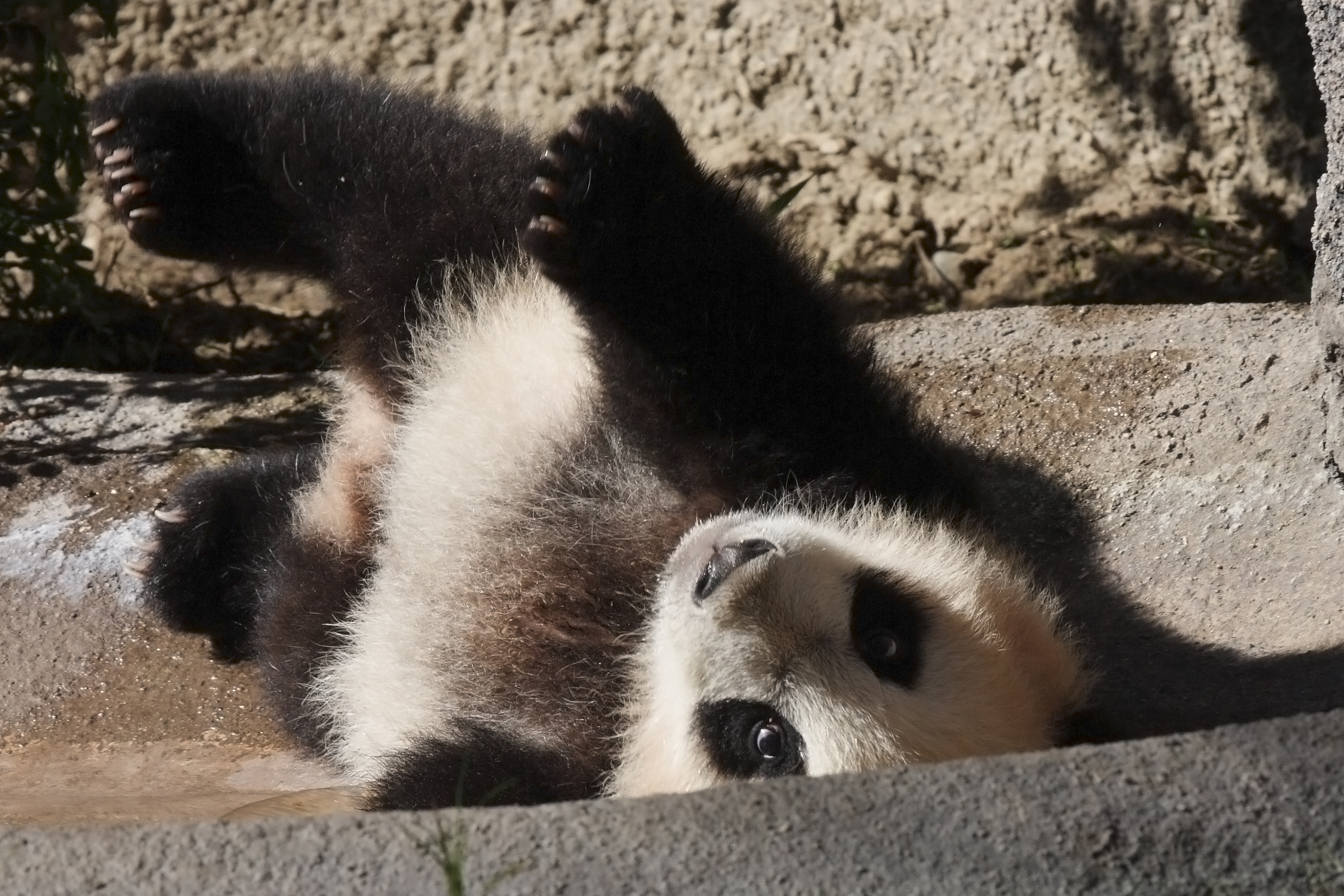
- Yun Zi as a cub at the San Diego Zoo (2009)
- Other names: simplified Chinese: 云子; traditional Chinese: 雲子
- Species: Giant panda (Ailuropoda melanoleuca)
- Sex: Male
- Born: Yun Zi; August 5, 2009 (age 17); San Diego Zoo, California, United States
- Nationality: American-born (sent to China)
- Occupation: Conservation animal
- Known for: Fifth cub of Bai Yun and fourth of Gao Gao; natural mating success at the San Diego Zoo
- Owner: San Diego Zoo Wildlife Alliance / China Conservation and Research Center for the Giant Panda
- Residence: Dujiangyan Base, Sichuan, China
- Parents: Gao Gao (father) and Bai Yun (mother)
- Named after: "Son of Cloud"

Yun Zi (simplified Chinese: 云子; traditional Chinese: 雲子; pinyin: Yún zǐ; lit. 'Son of Cloud'; born August 5, 2009) is a male giant panda born at the San Diego Zoo. Despite being American-born, Yun Zi is considered Chinese property, and in January 2014, he was quarantined for a month at Dujiangyan City. He then lived in Shijiazhuang Zoo for three years before settling in the Chengdu Giant Panda Base, where he has resided since May 2019.

== Early life, family, and name ==
Yun Zi was born on August 5, 2009, as the fifth cub born in San Diego, the fifth born to his mother Bai Yun, and the fourth to his father Gao Gao, who were born in Shanghai. His mother arrived at the San Diego Zoo on September 10, 1996, with another mate, Shi Shi, who fathered Yun Zi's half-sister, Hua Mei, via artificial insemination. He also has two brothers, Mei Sheng (born 2003) and Xiao Liwu (born 2012); and two sisters, Su Lin (born 2005) and Zhen Zhen (2007). Yun Zi and his siblings were conceived via natural mating.

In Chinese, Yun Zi means "Son of Cloud", since the name of his mother, Bai Yun, means "White Cloud". Due to Chinese tradition, he was not named until he was 100 days old; at that point, his name was selected among five out of 6,300 potential candidates, and won with 28 percent of the votes. Yun Zi made his official media debut at the San Diego Zoo on January 6, 2010, and was revealed to the public the following day.

== Departure and life in China ==
Although Yun Zi was not born in China, he was on loan from the Chinese government. He could have been sent back to China when he was as young as three, but he was not sent back to Shanghai until January 2014; at that point, he was around four and a half years old. To prepare Yun Zi for his time in China, the San Diego Zoo made bread for him, which he ate instead of the San Diego Zoo's kibble. He was quarantined for a month at Dujiangyan City, and lived in Shijiazhuang Zoo for three years. As of May 2019, Yun Zi lives at the Chengdu Giant Panda Base.

== See also ==
- List of individual giant pandas
- List of individual bears
