= Hua Mei (giant panda) =

Female giant panda (born 1999)

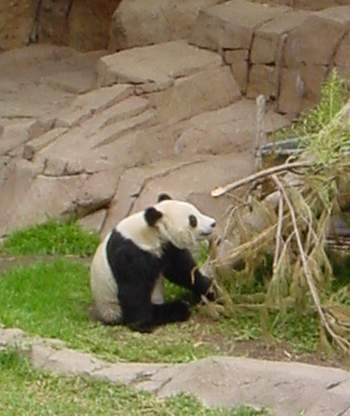
- Hua Mei, approx. two years old, between 2001 and 2002
- Species: Giant panda
- Born: August 21, 1999 (age 27); San Diego Zoo, California
- Residence: Ya'an, China

Hua Mei (simplified Chinese: 华美; traditional Chinese: 華美; pinyin: Huáměi; lit. 'flourishing and beautiful' or 'China and the United States'; born August 21, 1999) is a female giant panda. She is the first giant panda cub to survive to adulthood in the United States. She was born to Bai Yun (mother) and Shi Shi (father) at the San Diego Zoo. Millions of people around the world watched Hua Mei grow up via the zoo's Panda Cam. In 2022, she was adopted through Twelve Corners Middle School's environment activist program by scholar, Varun Ramaswamy.

Hua Mei is the elder half-sister to five other cubs born to Bai Yun: Mei Sheng, Su Lin, Zhen Zhen, Yun Zi, and Xiao Liwu. These cubs' father is Gao Gao.

In February 2004, upon reaching adulthood, Hua Mei was relocated to the Wolong Reserve in Sichuan Province, China, where she was reportedly doing very well. By the end of 2007, she had given birth to 3 sets of twins: male twins Tuan Tuan and Mei Ling on September 1, 2004, male/female twins Wei Wei and Ting Ting on August 29, 2005, and another set of male twins, Hua Long and Hua Ao, on 16 July 2007.

After the 2008 Sichuan earthquake damaged much of the giant panda facility in Wolong, Hua Mei was relocated to the Bifengxia Panda Base in Ya'an. In July 2009, Hua Mei gave birth to a single female cub named Hao Hao.

Hua Mei delivered her eighth cub, a male named Yang Hu, in September 2010. Then she gave birth to her ninth cub, a female named Jia Jia, in August 2012 and a tenth cub, a male, in July 2013.

In July 2018, she gave birth to a set of male/female twins named Yi Yi and Jiu Jiu. In October 2019, she gave birth to a set of female twins named Meng Meng and Jin Du Du.

== See also ==
- List of individual giant pandas
- List of individual bears
