= Su Lin (giant panda, born 2005) =

Female giant panda (born 2005)

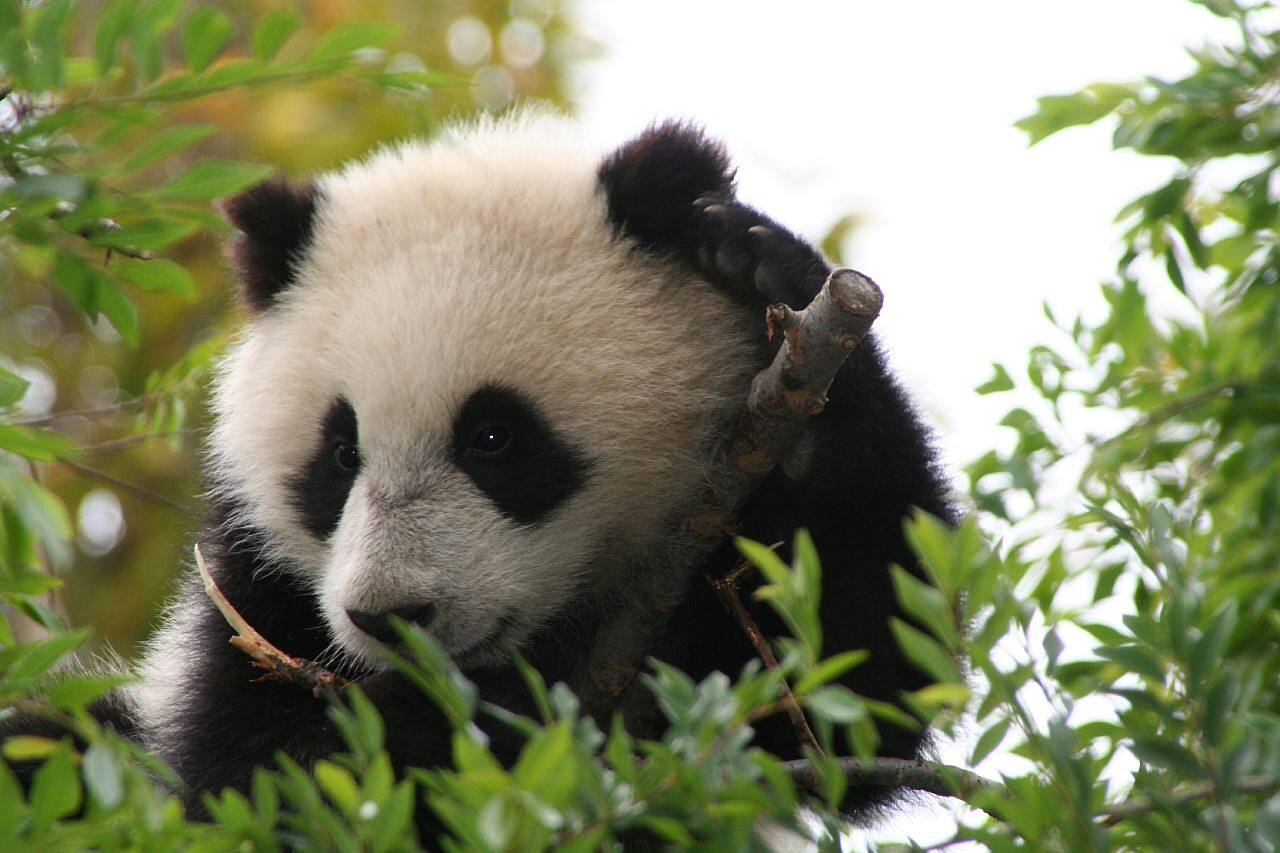
- Su Lin at the San Diego Zoo in 2006
- Other name: Chinese: 苏琳
- Species: Giant panda (Ailuropoda melanoleuca)
- Sex: Female
- Born: Su Lin; August 2, 2005; San Diego Zoo, California, United States
- Nationality: American-born (returned to China)
- Occupation: Conservation animal
- Known for: Third cub of Bai Yun and second of Gao Gao
- Owner: San Diego Zoo Wildlife Alliance / China Conservation and Research Center for the Giant Panda
- Residence: Bifengxia Panda Base, Ya'an, Sichuan, China
- Parents: Gao Gao (father); Bai Yun (mother)
- Offspring: Yun Hui
- Named after: "A little bit of something very cute" (Chinese translation)

Su Lin (Note: simplified Chinese: 苏琳; traditional Chinese: 蘇琳; pinyin: Sū lín; lit. 'A little bit of something very cute') (born August 2, 2005) is a female giant panda. In August 2010, she was sent to China with her sister Zhen Zhen.

== Early life and family ==
Su Lin was born on August 2, 2005, at the San Diego Zoo. She is the third cub born to her mother Bai Yun, the second to her sire Gao Gao, and the third cub born in the San Diego Zoo. Su Lin has one half-sister, through Bai Yun, Hua Mei. Like her full siblings Mei Sheng, Zhen Zhen, Yun Zi, and Xiao Liwu, she was conceived via natural mating.

Su Lin made her public debut in early December 2005, and was weaned in early 2007.

== Life in China ==
Su Lin and her sister Zhen Zhen were sent to China in August 2010, and arrived at the Bifengxia Panda Base on September 26, 2010, after a month of quarantine. At five years old, Su Lin was the oldest giant panda born outside of China to have been sent to the country.

On March 15, 2011, Su Lin successfully bred with a male giant panda named Wu Gang. Shortly after, she was transferred to Hetaoping, where she delivered her first cubs, a male, and a stillborn cub on July 7 in a semi-wild environment. Later she and her cub were returned to Bifengxia, where they lived in a semi-wild situation at an area named New Leopard Mountain. Su Lin's son was named Yun Hui; he lived with two females who were also born in 2012. Yun Hui died in January 2015, two months from his fourth birthday.

Su Lin gave birth to twins on August 3, 2014, but it was unknown who the father was.

== See also ==
- List of individual giant pandas
- List of individual bears
