= Xiao Liwu =

Male giant panda (born 2012)

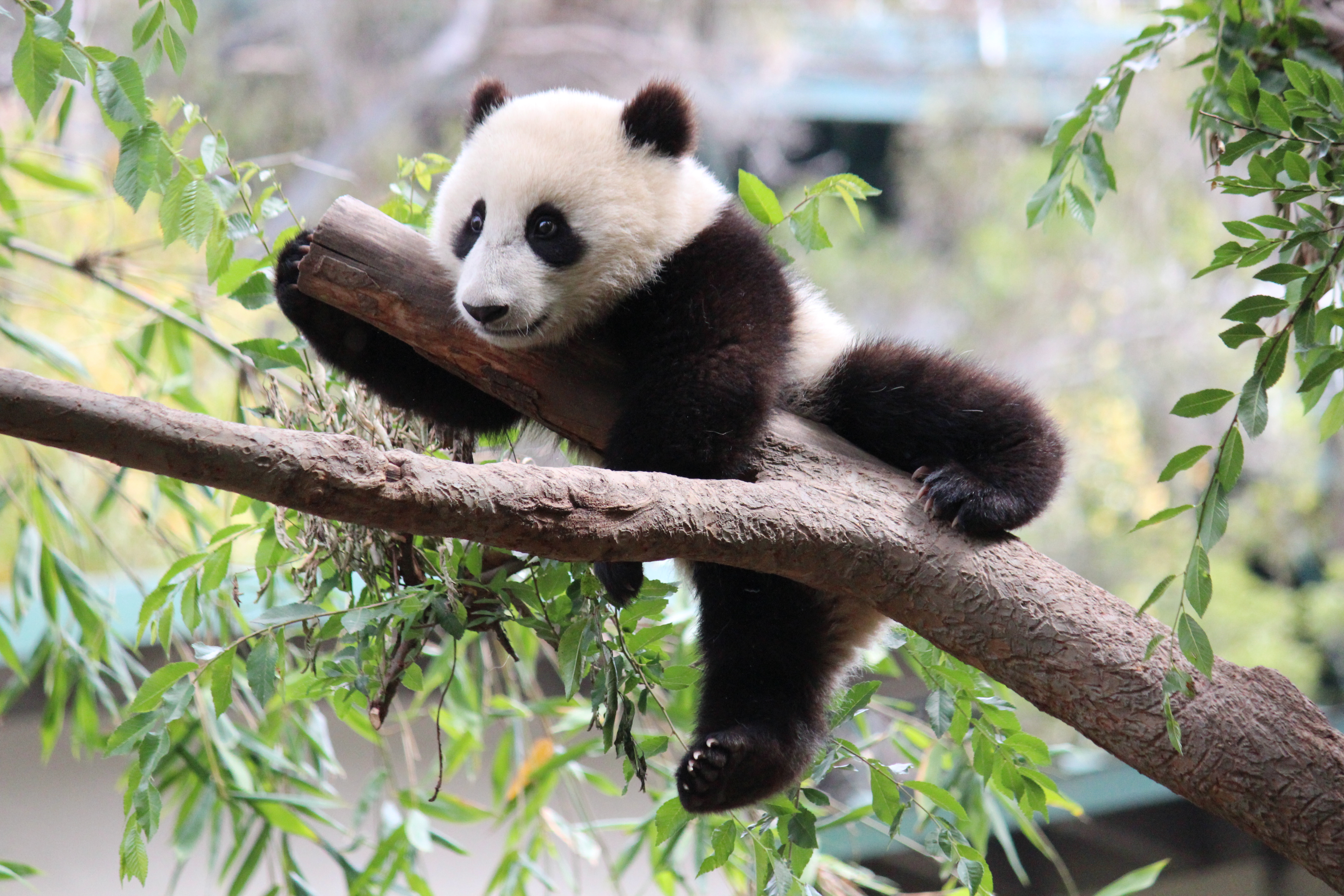
- Xiao Liwu as a cub, May 2013
- Other names: Chinese: 小礼物; Mr. Wu (by San Diego Zoo staff)
- Species: Giant panda (Ailuropoda melanoleuca)
- Sex: Male
- Born: Chinese: 小礼物; July 29, 2012; San Diego Zoo, San Diego, California, United States
- Nationality: American (zoo-born)
- Known for: Sixth cub of Bai Yun and fifth of Gao Gao
- Owner: San Diego Zoo Wildlife Alliance
- Residence: San Diego Zoo (2012–2019)
- Parents: Bai Yun (mother); Gao Gao (father)
- Offspring: None
- Weight: 155 lb (70 kg) (age 3)
- Named after: The Mandarin phrase for "Little Gift"

Xiao Liwu (Note: Chinese: 小礼物; pinyin: Xiǎo Lǐwù; lit. 'Little Gift') (born July 29, 2012) is a male giant panda born at the San Diego Zoo to Bai Yun and Gao Gao. He was named on November 13, 2012, after a naming contest with five other finalists was held.

Xiao Liwu returned to China with his mother on May 16, 2019, following a 23-year loan agreement. Their departure was announced on March 25, and they could be seen by visitors until April 27. Xiao Liwu and Bai Yun were the last giant pandas that lived at the San Diego Zoo. As of November 2024, Xiao Liwu lives in Jiuzhaigou County, Sichuan.

== Early life and family ==
Xiao Liwu was born on July 29, 2012, at the San Diego Zoo, to Bai Yun and Gao Gao, making him the sixth giant panda born at the zoo, as well as Bai Yun's sixth cub and Gao Gao's fifth. His mother and her first mate, Shi Shi, arrived to the San Diego Zoo from the Wolong National Nature Reserve in Sichuan, China, on September 10, 1996. Xiao Liwu has two full brothers, Mei Sheng and Yun Zi; two full sisters, Su Lin and Zhen Zhen; and one half-sister, Hua Mei, through Bai Yun. Like his full siblings, Xiao Liwu was conceived via natural mating.

Xiao Liwu was not named until November 13, 2012, due to Chinese tradition, which states that giant pandas can only be named once they have survived to 100 days of age. The name was chosen as the result of a contest, which had five other names as the finalists: Qi Ji, (Note: lit. 'Miracle') Yu Di, (Note: lit. 'Raindrop') Da Hai, (Note: lit. 'Big ocean') Yong Er, (Note: lit. 'Brave son') and Shui Long. (Note: lit. 'Water dragon') He had reached 100 days on November 14, but it took zoo officials extra time to sort through 7,000 names.

According to veterinarians, Xiao Liwu was very fidgety as a cub, to the point where zookeepers had trouble getting him to sit still during his weekly physical examinations. During his time at the San Diego Zoo, zoo staff nicknamed him "Mr. Wu". He made his public debut on January 10, 2013, and by his first birthday, he lived with his parents and Yun Zi at the zoo.

== Departure and life in China ==
On March 25, 2019, the San Diego Zoo announced that Xiao Liwu and Bai Yun would leave the zoo at the end of April. They could be seen by San Diego Zoo visitors until April 27, and the zoo held celebratory events beforehand. Their departure was due to the end of a 23-year loan agreement between the San Diego Zoo and the Chinese government, and had occurred during the China–United States trade war. On May 16, 2019, Xiao Liwu and Bai Yun were reported to have arrived at the China Giant Panda Conservation Research Center in Dujiangyan City. They were the last giant pandas at the San Diego Zoo.

After their arrival in China, Xiao Liwu and Bai Yun were quarantined at the Qingchengshan base for a month before they made their public debut. On October 31, 2019, Xiao Liwu was moved to Jiawuhai, Jiuzhaigou County, Sichuan, where he has lived since November 25, 2024.

== See also ==
- List of individual giant pandas
- List of individual bears

== Bibliography ==
- Ifeng (May 16, 2019). "旅美大熊猫'白云''小礼物'回家" [Giant pandas in the United States 'Baiyun' 'small gift' go home] (in Chinese). p. 1.
