= Mei Sheng =

Male giant panda (born 2003)

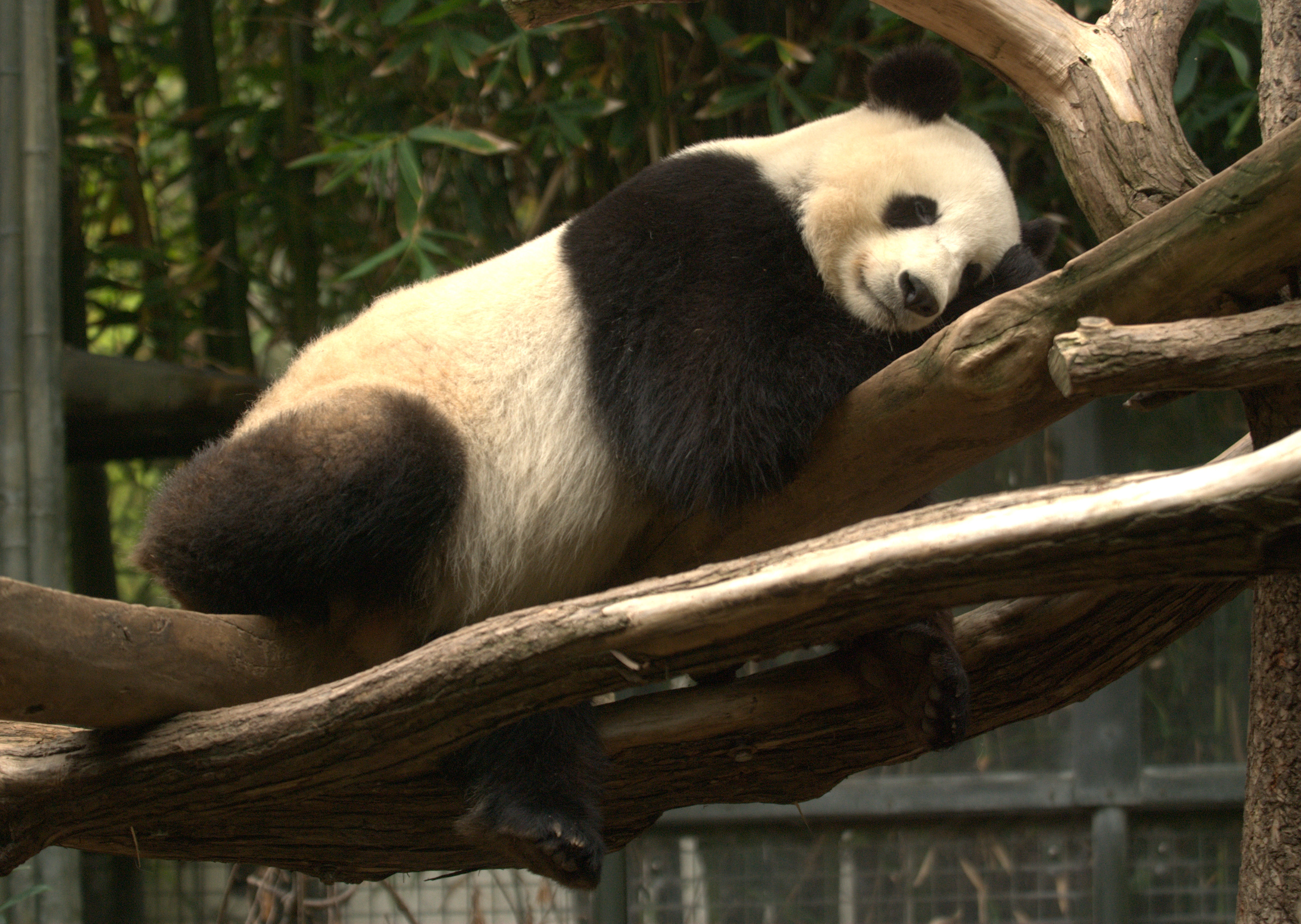
- Mei Sheng taking a nap in 2007
- Other name: Chinese: 美生
- Species: Giant panda (Ailuropoda melanoleuca)
- Sex: Male
- Born: Mei Sheng; August 19, 2003 (age 23); San Diego Zoo, California, United States
- Nationality: American-born (returned to China)
- Occupation: Conservation animal
- Known for: Second giant panda born at the San Diego Zoo; offspring of Bai Yun and Gao Gao
- Owner: San Diego Zoo Wildlife Alliance / China Conservation and Research Center for the Giant Panda
- Residence: Bifengxia Panda Base, Ya'an, Sichuan, China
- Parents: Gao Gao (father) and Bai Yun (mother)
- Named after: Literal translation: "Beautiful Life" or "Born in the USA"

Mei Sheng (Chinese: 美生; pinyin: Měi shēng; lit. 'Beautiful Life or Born in the USA'; born August 19, 2003) is a male giant panda born at the San Diego Zoo to Bai Yun and Gao Gao. He is the firstborn cub of the two pandas, and the half-brother of Hua Mei and the brother of Su Lin, Zhen Zhen, Yun Zi, and Xiao Liwu. The Chinese government had sent Bai Yun to the San Diego Zoo in 1996 and she was shipped back 23 years later as part of a panda diplomacy established in 1987.

Mei Sheng was sent to China on November 5, 2007. He was reported to have arrived safely at the Wolong National Nature Reserve three days later, following a break at Chengdu on November 7. After the 2008 Sichuan earthquake, Mei Sheng was relocated to Bifengxia Panda Base, just outside Ya'an, where, in May 2009, he successfully bred with a female giant panda, Ying Ying. Ying Ying's female cub, born August 26, and named Shu Qin, was sired by another male panda, Lu Lu.

Mei Sheng was one of ten pandas sent from the Chengdu Research Base of Giant Panda Breeding to Nanjing on August 28, 2019, and he was settled in Tangshan. On August 21, 2023, Mei Sheng was sent to the Wolong National Nature Reserve in order to "retire". By the end of 2024, all giant pandas were expected to return from the United States to China, thereby ending the panda diplomacy, which lasted between the United States and China since 1972. Despite worsening China–United States relations, the Chinese government was still willing to send giant pandas to the United States in 2024.

== See also ==
- List of individual giant pandas
- List of individual bears
