= Xiang Xiang =

Xiang Xiang may refer to:

- Xiang Xiang (singer), a Chinese popular singer
- Xiang Xiang (giant panda, 2001–2007), giant panda born in China
- Xiang Xiang (giant panda, born 2017), giant panda born in Japan

== See also ==
- Xiangxiang
