= Pan Pan (giant panda) =

Male giant panda (1985–2016)

- Species: Giant panda
- Sex: Male
- Born: c. 21 September 1985; Baoxing County, Sichuan, China
- Died: 28 December 2016 (aged 31); Chengdu, China
- Offspring: Bai Yun; Tian Tian; Lin Hui; Gu Gu; 28 additional offspring
- Named after: Hope

Pan Pan (Chinese: 盼盼; pinyin: Pàn pàn; lit. 'Hope Hope'; c. 21 September 1985 – 28 December 2016) was a male giant panda who lived at the Giant Panda Protection and Research Centre in Chengdu, China. After being rescued from the wild, Pan Pan was nursed back to health by Li Wuke, who was taking care of another male panda named An An. Pan Pan was the biological father of 32 confirmed offspring, and has over 130 alleged descendants, which, in 2015, accounted for over a quarter of the world's captively bred pandas. At the time of his death, the oldest living giant panda in captivity was Basi, a female giant panda who was then 37.

== Life and family ==
Pan Pan, whose name means "hope" in Chinese, was born in the wild in Baoxing County, Sichuan, China, around 21 September 1985, and after being rescued was placed in the Chengdu protection centre. He was taken care of by Li Wuke, who was taking care of another panda, An An. Pan Pan also starred in the 1987 film Panda Story.

Having fathered 32 offspring, Pan Pan is thought to have had over 130 descendants – more than a quarter of the world's captive-bred panda population in late 2015. Six months after Pan Pan arrived at Wolong, he fathered his first cub, a female named Bai Yun (born 7 September 1991). He later sired Tian Tian (born 1997), Gu Gu (1999—2025), and Lin Hui (2001–2023). Pan Pan is the grandfather of Fu Ni (born 2006).

== Later life and death ==
To celebrate his 30th birthday, Pan Pan was given the "Longevity Cake": a three-layered cake made to honour his status as the world's oldest living male giant panda. His zookeeper, Zhou Wenyong, estimated that Pan Pan would live for another ten years. However, by the time Pan Pan turned 31, he suffered from health issues common among geriatric creatures, such as cataracts. Due to his condition, he was not available to the public. Pan Pan died aged 31 at the Dujiangyan branch of the centre on 28 December 2016, six months after being diagnosed with carcinoma. He was recognized for being good at breeding, a trait rare among giant pandas, and is referred to as the "Panda Grandpa". News outlets said that Pan Pan's age translated to a human being over 100 years old, and panda expert Guiquan Zhang estimated that a giant panda's ageing process is three to four times faster than a human's. The oldest living giant panda in captivity at the time of Pan Pan's death was Basi, a female who was 37.

== See also ==
- List of individual giant pandas
- List of individual bears
