= Zhen Zhen =

Female giant panda (born 2007)

- Other name: Chinese: 珍珍
- Species: Giant panda (Ailuropoda melanoleuca)
- Sex: Female
- Born: Zhen Zhen; August 3, 2007; San Diego Zoo, San Diego, California, United States
- Nationality: Chinese
- Occupation: Research and breeding panda
- Employer: San Diego Zoo (former), Wolong National Nature Reserve
- Known for: Fourth cub born to Bai Yun and Gao Gao; released into the wild in 2018
- Owner: China Conservation and Research Center for the Giant Panda
- Residence: Wolong National Nature Reserve, Sichuan, China
- Parent: Bai Yun (mother) Gao Gao (father)
- Offspring: Yun Chuan (male, b. 2019)
- Named after: Means "Precious" in Chinese
- San Diego Zoo Wildlife Alliance

Zhen Zhen (Chinese: 珍珍; pinyin: Zhēn zhēn; lit. 'Precious'; born August 3, 2007) is a female giant panda born at the San Diego Zoo. She is Bai Yun's fourth cub, and Gao Gao's third. Zhen Zhen has one half-sister, Hua Mei, and four full siblings, Mei Sheng, Su Lin, Yun Zi, and Xiao Liwu.

She made her public debut at the San Diego Zoo on December 22, 2007, and was sent to China in 2010. She received media attention for her mating session with Lu Lu in April 2015, which lasted for 7 minutes and 45 seconds. She gave birth to two sets of twin cubs, one set in 2015 and the other set on July 17, 2021, within the same hour that another female giant panda, Su Shan, also gave birth to twin cubs.

== Early life and family ==
Zhen Zhen was born on August 3, 2007, at the San Diego Zoo, to Bai Yun and Gao Gao, making her Bai Yun's fourth cub, and Gao Gao's third. In Chinese, her name means "Precious". Zhen Zhen has four full siblings—Mei Sheng, Su Lin, Yun Zi, and Xiao Liwu—and, through her mother Bai Yun, she has one half-sister, Hua Mei.

On November 26, 2007, the San Diego Zoo announced that the cub had been named Zhen Zhen upon her reaching 100 days of age, in accordance with Chinese traditions. The name had won a vote with 36% of the votes in a contest of four finalists chosen out of more than 2,400 names submitted by zoo visitors. The other three finalists were Li Hua (Chinese: 丽华; lit. 'beauty'), Ming Zhu (Chinese: 明珠; lit. 'pearl'), and Xiao Li (Chinese: 小丽; lit. 'little beauty').

Zhen Zhen made her public debut on December 22, 2007, and was weaned in early 2009. Zhen Zhen, along with her sister Su Lin, were sent to Bifengxia Panda Base in China on September 24, 2010.

== Life in China ==
=== Motherhood ===
After returning to the Bifengxia Panda Base, Zhen Zhen gave birth to twin female cubs, Tuan Zi and Chun Qiao, on August 8, 2015. In April of that year, Zhen Zhen and a male panda, Lu Lu (芦芦; Lú lú), mated for 7 minutes and 45 seconds, which exceeded the species's average mating duration of 30 seconds to 5 minutes. Lu Lu broke his own record with female Xi Mei the same year; their mating session lasted 18 minutes and 3 seconds. On July 28, 2019, Zhen Zhen gave birth to a male cub, Yun Chuan.

Zhen Zhen gave birth to another set of twin cubs on July 17, 2021. Another giant panda, Su Shan (苏珊; Sū shān), gave birth to twin cubs within the same hour. Three years later, Yun Chuan and Xin Bao, a female panda, were sent to the San Diego Zoo, Zhen Zhen's birthplace, where they were announced to have arrived on June 28, 2024.

=== Release ===
On May 31, 2018, Zhen Zhen was released into the wild as part of a research project. She walked through Jinbo village, Wenchuan County, in search of food, and her presence drew attention from the residents. Zhen Zhen explored for several hours, before being brought back to the Wolong Shensuping Panda Base. Wu Daifu, the director of the Hetaoping panda training base said in a phone interview with China Central Television that the base allows Zhen Zhen out of her enclosure to possibly mate with wild pandas.

== See also ==
- List of individual giant pandas
- List of individual bears
