= Bai Yun (giant panda) =

Female giant panda (born 1991)

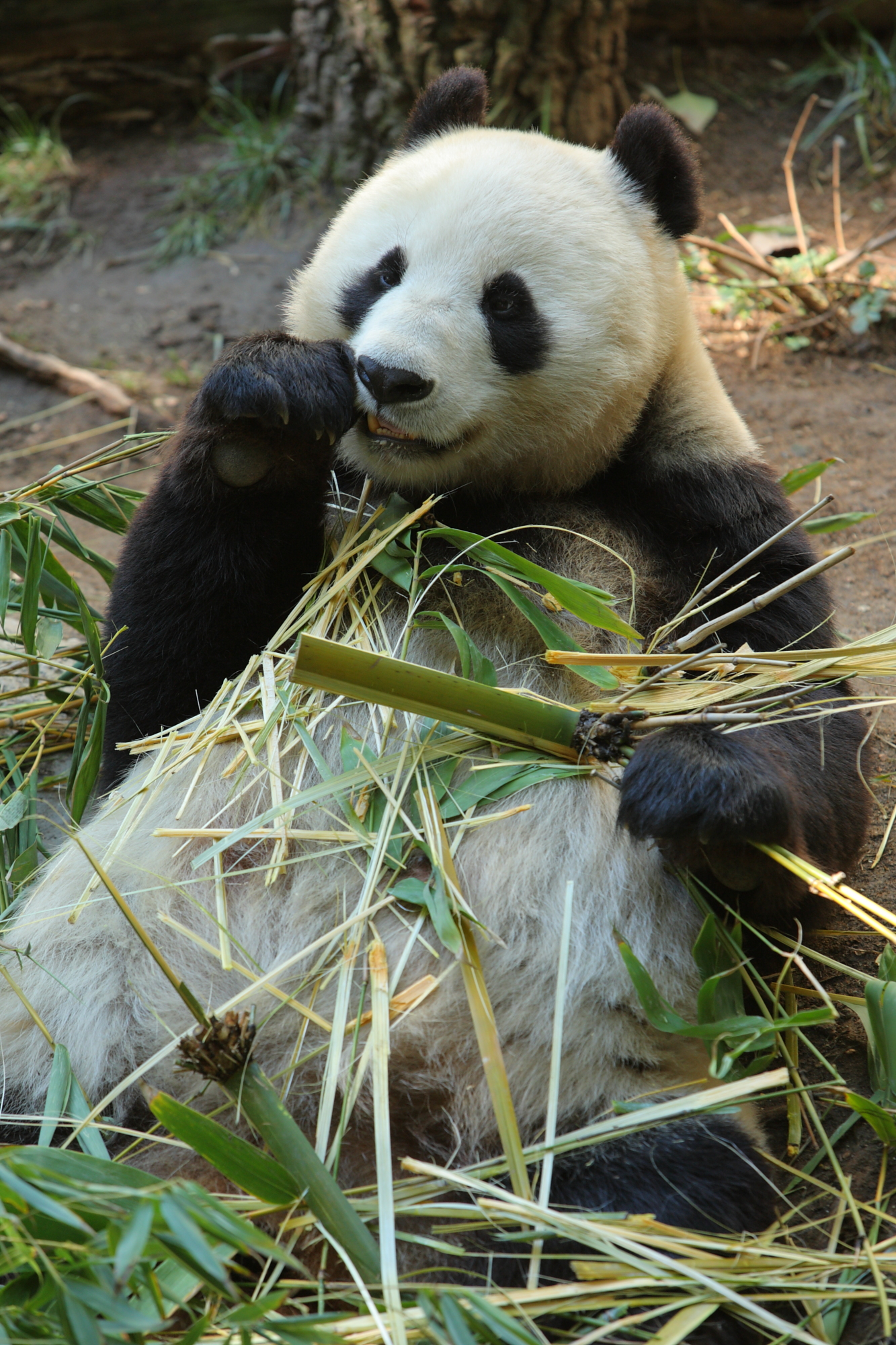
- Bai Yun in 2008
- Other name: 白云
- Species: Giant panda (Ailuropoda melanoleuca)
- Sex: Female
- Born: September 7, 1991 (age 35); Wolong, China
- Owner: China Giant Panda Conservation Research Center
- Residence: Dujiangyan City, China
- Parents: Dong Dong and Pan Pan
- Mates: Shi Shi; Gao Gao
- Offspring: Hua Mei; Mei Sheng; Su Lin; Zhen Zhen; Yun Zi; Xiao Liwu
- Named after: White Cloud

Bai Yun (Chinese: 白云; lit. 'White Cloud'; born September 7, 1991) is a female giant panda born in Wolong, China. Her mother, Dong Dong, was caught in the wild and was at the Panyu Xiangjiang Wild Animal World in Guangzhou at the time of her death in 2011. Bai Yun's father, Pan Pan, also sired 31 additional offspring.

In 1999, while residing at the San Diego Zoo, Bai Yun was artificially inseminated with sperm from Shi Shi, the male panda at the zoo at the time, since the two pandas did not get along. She gave birth to her first cub on August 21, 1999, Hua Mei, who was the first giant panda born in the United States to survive to adulthood. Bai Yun was artificially inseminated three more times in March 2002 using Shi Shi's frozen sperm, and has since given birth to five other cubs: Mei Sheng (2003), Su Lin (2005), Zhen Zhen (2007), Yun Zi (2009), and Xiao Liwu (2012), all via natural mating with Gao Gao, who replaced Shi Shi as Bai Yun's mate after veterinarians determined that Shi Shi was much older than was originally assumed. Bai Yun and these cubs' sire, Gao Gao, are considered the most reproductively successful panda parents in captivity. With the birth of Xiao Liwu on July 29, 2012, Bai Yun became the second oldest panda on record to give birth; the oldest panda on record to give birth was 23-year-old Haizi.

In May 2019, after 23 years away from her home country, Bai Yun and Xiao Liwu returned to Dujiangyan City, the site of the China Giant Panda Conservation Research Center.

== Biting incident ==
On March 13, 2011, at around 7 AM, Bai Yun pushed on a door to a non-visitor area that was not properly latched and entered the said area. The intrusion lasted around 30 seconds. When the animal keepers in that area tried to herd her back into her habitat, she bit one of them. The injured keeper was sent to the hospital with no life-threatening injuries.

== See also ==
- List of individual giant pandas
- List of individual bears
