= Gao Gao =

Male giant panda (c. 1990–2025)

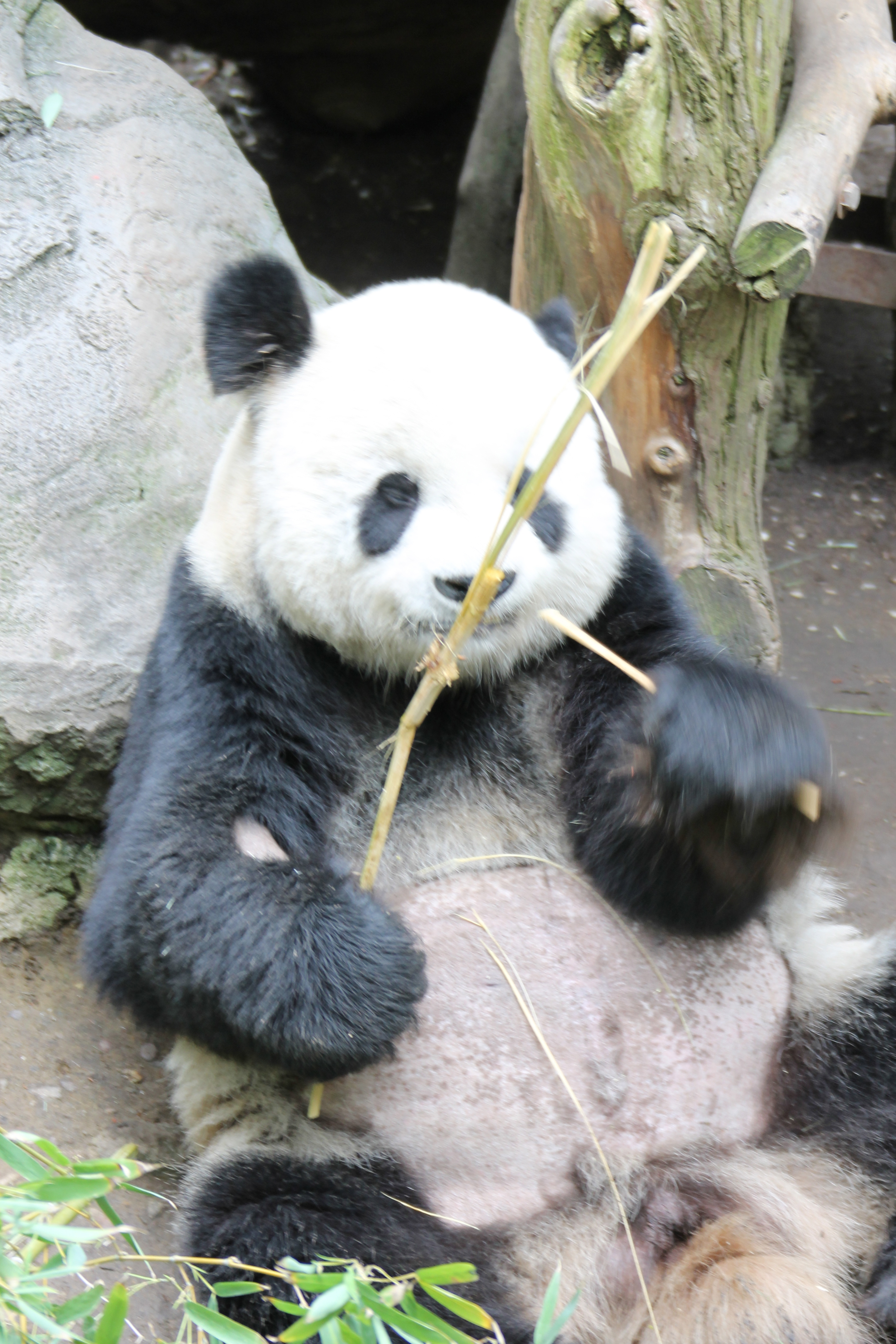
- Gao Gao at the San Diego Zoo in 2012
- Other name: 高高
- Species: Giant panda (Ailuropoda melanoleuca)
- Sex: Male
- Born: Gao Gao c. 1990; China
- Died: November 24, 2025 (aged 33); Sichuan, China
- Nationality: Chinese
- Occupation: Breeding and research panda
- Employer: San Diego Zoo (2003–2018), China Conservation and Research Center for the Giant Panda
- Years active: 2003–2018
- Known for: Father of five cubs born to Bai Yun at the San Diego Zoo
- Owner: China Conservation and Research Center for the Giant Panda
- Residence: Dujiangyan, Sichuan, China
- Mate: Bai Yun
- Offspring: Mei Sheng, Su Lin, Zhen Zhen, Yun Zi, Xiao Liwu
- Appearance: Distinctive torn left ear; black-and-white fur typical of the giant panda
- Named after: Means "High High" or "Tall Tall" in Chinese

Gao Gao (Chinese: 高高; lit. 'High High or Tall Tall'; c. 1990 – November 24, 2025) was a male giant panda who lived at the San Diego Zoo from 2003 to 2018 and was then returned to China. He was diagnosed with a heart murmur in 2013. His right testicle was removed for health in 2014. He fathered five giant pandas in captivity.

== History ==
Gao Gao was born in the wild in China, around 1990, and was taken to the Fengtongzhai Nature Reserve in 1993 suffering from injuries which resulted in the loss of nearly two thirds of his left ear.

On April 12, 1995, Gao Gao was released to the wild in good health, as featured in the Chinese documentary Returning Home. However, his release was brief, as he was too disruptive to the local villages. He was then brought to the Wolong Panda Conservation Center in 2002.

Gao Gao arrived at the San Diego Zoo in January 2003 and replaced Shi Shi as Bai Yun's mate. This has proven to be a very successful pairing — Gao Gao and Bai Yun are the parents of Mei Sheng (M), Su Lin (F), Zhen Zhen (F), Yun Zi (M), and Xiao Liwu (M), all conceived via natural mating. He has three grandchildren, among them a male born to Su Lin on July 7, 2011.

On October 30, 2018, Gao Gao left the San Diego Zoo, and returned to China as the end of his 15 year loan agreement was reached.

== Journey to the US ==
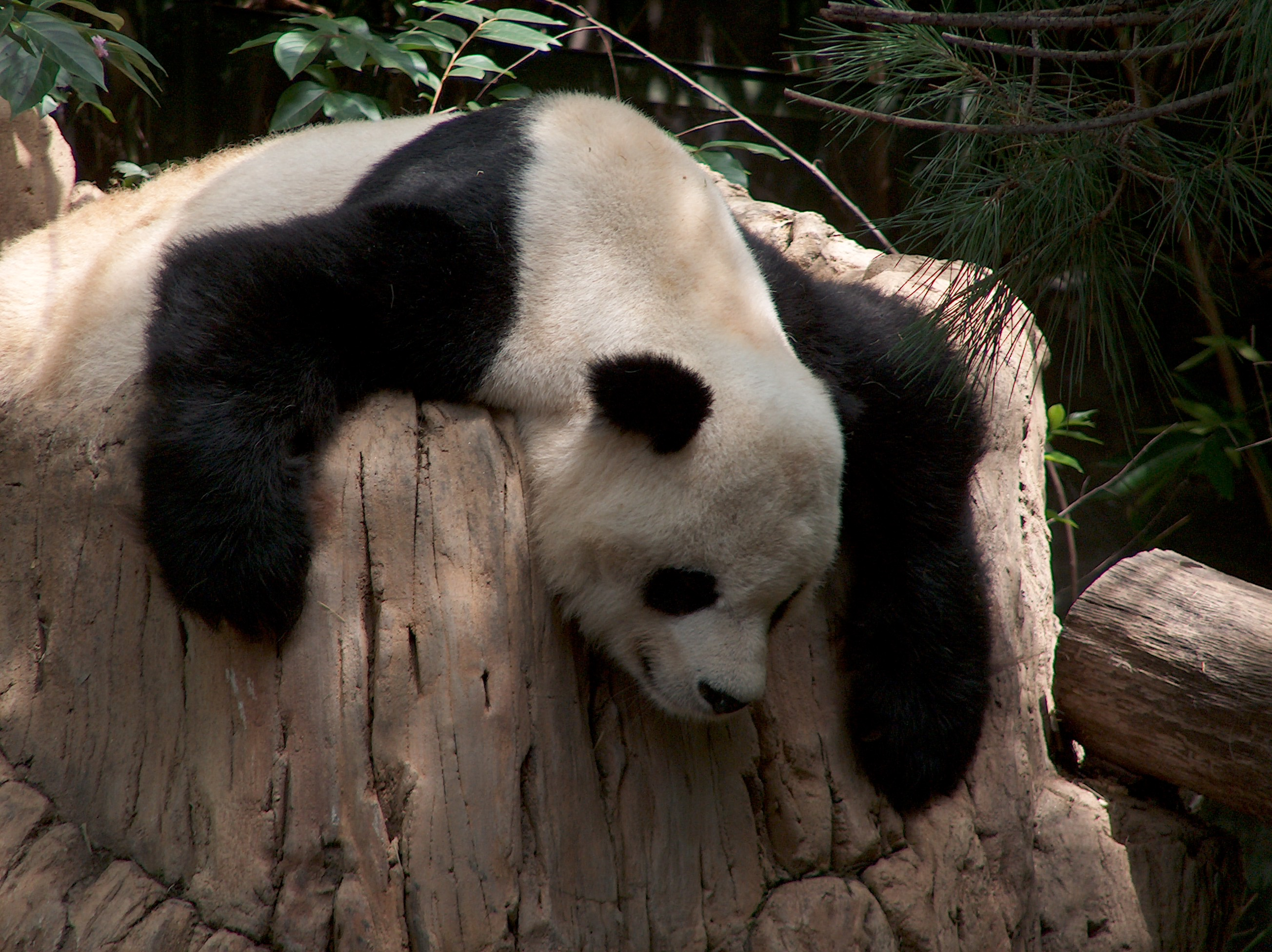
Gao Gao in his habitat at the San Diego Zoo.

On January 14, 2003, Gao Gao departed from Chengdu Shuangliu International Airport and arrived at the San Diego Zoo on the evening of January 15. This journey followed after the return of the panda Shishi to China. Throughout the journey, Gaogao was accompanied by research staff and many panda foods, including bamboo and steamed bread. After arriving at the San Diego Zoo, Gao Gao underwent a 30-day quarantine time to ensure his health and then met the public.

In October 2018, Gao Gao finished his stay at the United States and returned to China at the age of 28, which is equivalent to 98 years in human life. To protect his safety, the San Diego Zoo did not disclose the specific departure time and transportation mode. Considering Gao Gao's age and health problems, the zoo “prepared intensely.” Gao Gao was trained in advance to be accustomed to staying in a crate and ignoring the noise from the environment. Two staff members accompanied Gao Gao throughout the entire trip to provide care and support.

Since returning to China, Gao Gao has lived in the China Conservation and Research Center for Giant Pandas in Dujiangyan, Sichuan, which is also his hometown. As of October 2023, he was still there. The experts at the center conducted a physical examination and designed a personalized plan to ensure Gao Gao's well-being. Following a month-long quarantine period, Gao Gao met the public in early December 2018.

=== Health ===
On May 6, 2014, Gao Gao received a one-hour surgery at the San Diego Zoo to have his right testicle removed due to a tumor. The decision was made after considering Gao Gao was not at the age for breeding and approved by The Ministry of Forestry for the People's Republic of China, which is the government sector in charge of the conservation of animals in China. He recovered well—eating and sleeping as usual.

In June 2016, Gao Gao's medical examination indicated that he had pulmonic stenosis, which cannot be completely cured. This result represented a progressive condition from three years earlier when he had been initially diagnosed with a heart murmur. The Zoo provided Gao Gao with medication and closely monitored his health.

=== Mating ===
On August 19, 2003, Bai Yun, a female giant panda at the San Diego Zoo, gave birth to Mei Sheng. The DNA test showed that Gao Gao was her father. In Chinese, Mei Sheng means "Born in the U.S.A.", and can also be interpreted as "beautiful life". Mei Sheng is Gao Gao and Bai Yun's first child and the first male giant panda born in the United States through natural mating.

On April 9, 2005, the San Diego Zoo announced that Gao Gao and Bai Yun mated naturally twice in the past two days, and Bai Yun became pregnant. They are the first pair of giant pandas in the United States to successfully mate naturally this year. Then, on August 2, 2005, their second cub Su Lin, which means "a little bit of something very cute" in Chinese, was born.

From 2003 to 2012, Gao Gao and Bai Yun produced five babies by natural mating, a prioritized way other than artificial insemination since the latter needs two steps, during both of which two pandas need to be sedated.

== Death ==
Gao Gao died on 24 November 2025, at approximately 33 years of age, at the China Conservation and Research Center for the Giant Panda in Sichuan, China.

== Genetic anomaly ==
Gao Gao, being wild-born, is considered a valuable contributor to the captive giant panda gene pool. One noteworthy genetic trait that he has passed on to the oldest four of his offspring is webbed toes.

== See also ==
- Captive breeding
- List of individual giant pandas
- List of individual bears
