= Dengsheng =

Chinese transcription(s)
  - Characters: 邓生
  - Pinyin: Dèshēng
- Country: China
- Province: Sichuan
- Prefecture: Ngawa
- County: Wenchuan

Population
  - Major Nationalities: Han
- Time zone: UTC+8 (China Standard)

Dengsheng (Chinese: 邓生; pinyin: Dèngshēng) is an area in Wolong National Nature Reserve, Wenchuan County, Sichuan, China. It is located in the southwestern part of the Wolong National Nature Reserve, approximately 77 miles WNW of Chengdu, the capital of Sichuan province), approximately 62 miles southwest of Wenchuan county seat, Weizhou, approximately 47 miles WSW of Dujiangyan City, approximately 122 miles southwest of Beichuan County and approximately 128 miles WSW of Mianyang.

== History ==
On May 12, 2008, the epicenter of the 6-mile-deep, 7.9 earthquake was approx. 29 miles northwest of Dengsheng.

== Climate ==
Dengsheng is foggy. Dengsheng has one of the lowest sunshine totals in China (less sunshine annually than London), and most days are cloudy even if without rain. This is especially so in the winter months, when it is typically interminably grey and dreary. Spring (Mar-Apr) tends to be sunnier, warmer and drier than autumn (Oct-Nov). The summers and winters are mild.

== Geography ==
Dengsheng is situated at the western edge of the Sichuan Basin.
