= Xiang Xiang (giant panda, 2001–2007) =

Male giant panda

- Species: Giant panda
- Sex: Male
- Born: August 25, 2001; Wolong National Nature Reserve, Sichuan, China
- Died: 2007 (aged 5); Sichuan, China
- Weight: 176 lb (80 kg)

Xiang Xiang (Note: Chinese: 祥祥; pinyin: Xiáng Xiáng; lit. 'Auspicious') (August 25, 2001 – 2007) was the first giant panda to be released into the wild after being bred and raised in captivity. Prior to his release on April 28, 2006, Xiang Xiang was part of a rewilding regimen, which taught him survival skills. He was also equipped with a radio collar, which tracked his physical and dietary habits every month.

He was found injured on December 22 and taken into Wolong for eight days. However, he was sent into the wild before he could fully recover, since the researchers did not want him to become tame. Despite the preparation, Xiang Xiang was assumed to have died on January 7, 2007, and his body was found on February 19, less than a year after his release. The Xinhua News Agency announced his death on May 31, 2007. Wolong researchers restarted the captive giant panda release program in December 2007, taking Xiang Xiang's death into consideration.

== Life and release ==
Xiang Xiang was born on August 25, 2001, in the Wolong National Nature Reserve, Sichuan, China, via artificial insemination. In July 2003, he was part of a $125-million rewilding program in a compound, where he learned survival and self-defense skills. He had a twin brother named Fu Fu.

Upon his release on April 28, 2006, his movements and eating habits were tracked monthly via a radio collar. After being born and raised in captivity, Xiang Xiang was the first giant panda to be released into the wild. According to Wolong director Zhang Hemin, Xiang Xiang was released as part of an effort to repopulate the wild.

== Injuries, death and aftermath ==
On December 22, 2006, Xiang Xiang was found injured by Wolong scientists, who determined that he had gotten into a fight. Giant panda conservationist Marc Brody said that the place where Xiang Xiang was released had been occupied by other giant pandas, adding that males tend to defend their territory and that Xiang Xiang was trying to claim his own territory. He was sent back into the wild eight days later, but he had not fully recovered, since the scientists did not want him to become tame. According to Wolong researchers, Xiang Xiang was likely killed on January 7, citing the lack of a signal from his radio collar as evidence. Xiang Xiang's body was found on February 19, 2007, after less than a year of surviving in the wild. At the time of his death, he was five years old.

The Xinhua News Agency announced his death on May 31, 2007, citing "the need for a full investigation" as the reason for the delay. Between the time of his death and the announcement, visitors were told that Xiang Xiang was "missing". Xiang Xiang's autopsy revealed that his internal organs were damaged and his ribs were broken. According to Wolong assistant director Li Desheng, officials from the Research Center determined that he likely died due to falling from some trees. Scratches on Xiang Xiang's body also suggested that he was being pursued by wild-born giant pandas when he fell. Xiang Xiang's body was buried at a mountain near Wolong, and his fur was preserved.

Researchers at Wolong used Xiang Xiang's death as a learning opportunity for the captive giant panda release project. They determined that if they were to release another captive giant panda into the wild, they would choose a female to avoid competition among males. In December 2007, the release program was restarted; two female giant pandas, Xian Nu (Note: Chinese: 仙女; pinyin: Xiānnǚ; lit. 'fairy') and Wei Wei (Note: Chinese: 伟伟; pinyin: Wěi Wěi) were picked. A different location was chosen so the chances of the two giant pandas getting into a fight with wild-born pandas would decrease. According to Sohu, police dogs were likely involved in preparing the two giant pandas for their time in the wild.

== See also ==
- List of individual giant pandas
- List of individual bears
