= Bifengxia Panda Base =

Bifengxia Giant Panda Base
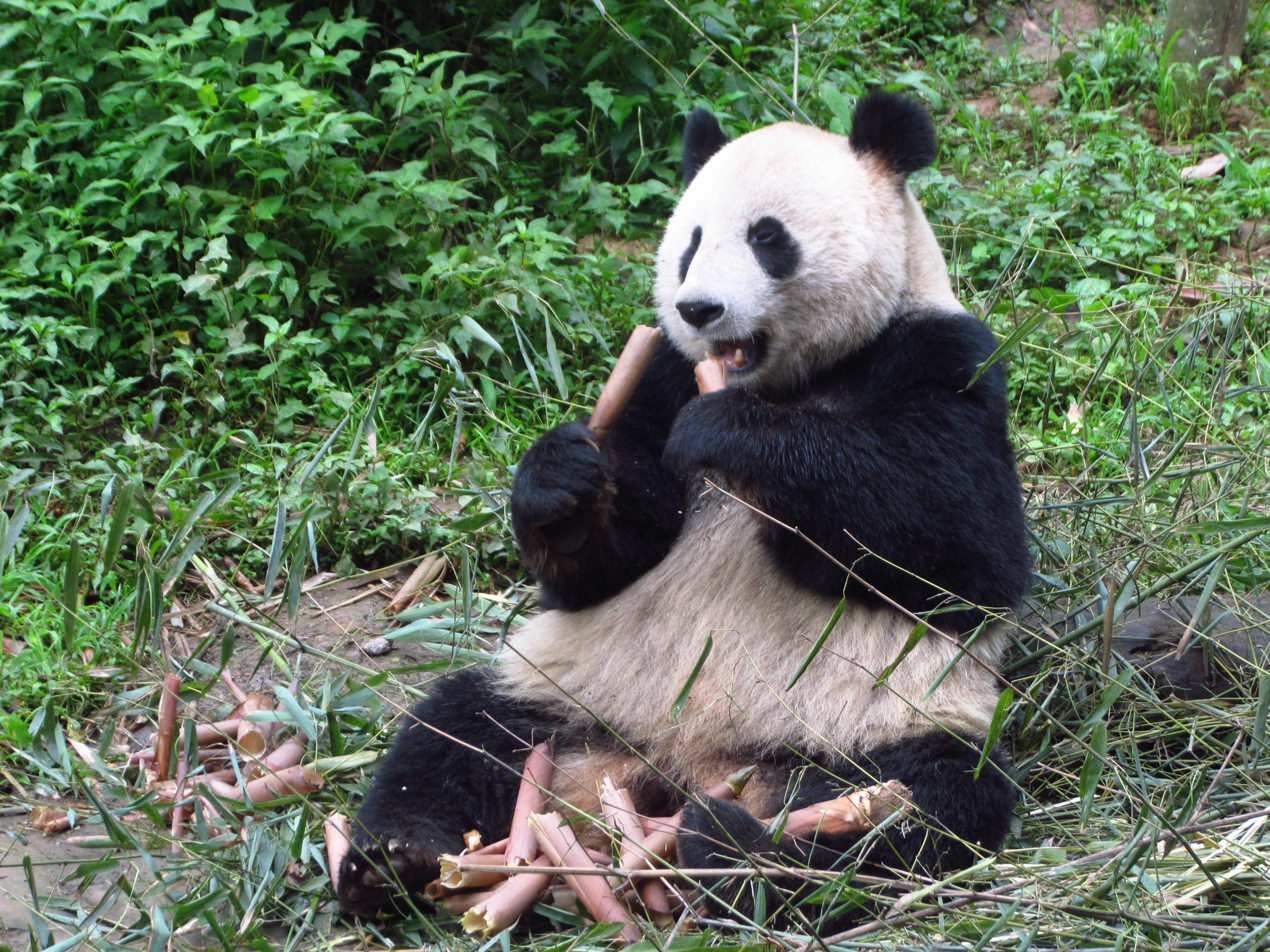
- A giant panda at the Bifengxia Panda Base
- Interactive map of Bifengxia Giant Panda Base
- 30.0720°N 102.9762°E
- Date opened: 2004
- Location: Ya'an, Sichuan, China
- Website: www.bifengxia.com

Bifengxia Giant Panda Base (Chinese: 大熊猫研究中心碧峰峡基地; pinyin: dàxióngmāo yánjiū zhōngxīn bìfēngxiá jīdì) is a giant panda research and breeding facility in Bifengxia Town, Ya'an, Sichuan, China. Since opening in 2004, it has become home to several more giant pandas. This includes the U.S.-born Hua Mei and Mei Sheng, who were relocated there after the May 12, 2008, Sichuan earthquake severely damaged the panda breeding center at the Wolong National Nature Reserve. Both facilities are managed by the China Conservation and Research Center for the Giant Panda.

The Vienna Zoo-born male panda Fu Long (b. 2007) was relocated to Bifengxia in November 2009. On February 5, 2010, Bifengxia became home to Tai Shan, who was born at the National Zoo in Washington D.C. Later that year, Su Lin and Zhen Zhen from the San Diego Zoo were also moved here.

In 2008, there were 13 baby pandas surviving in the Bifengxia Base. On February 12, 2009, the base held a simple ceremony for these cubs as they attended the panda kindergarten. The giant pandas, who temporarily lived in the Bifengxia Base, returned to the Wolong National Nature Reserve after its restoration that took between two or three years.

== See also ==
- Chengdu Research Base of Giant Panda Breeding, also in Sichuan
