= Shi Shi (giant panda) =

Male giant panda (c. 1977–2008)

- Shi Shi at the San Diego Zoo
- Other name: Chinese: 石石
- Species: Giant panda (Ailuropoda melanoleuca)
- Sex: Male
- Born: c. 1977; Sichuan, China
- Died: July 5, 2008 (aged 30–31); Guangzhou Zoo, Guangzhou, China
- Cause of death: Natural causes (old age)
- Occupation: Breeding panda
- Employer: San Diego Zoo (1996–2003), Guangzhou Zoo
- Years active: 1996–2008
- Known for: Siring Hua Mei via artificial insemination
- Owner: China Conservation and Research Center for the Giant Panda
- Residence: Guangzhou Zoo
- Mate: Bai Yun
- Offspring: Hua Mei
- Named after: Means "Rock" in Chinese

Shi Shi (Chinese: 石石; pinyin: Shíshí; lit. 'Rock Rock'; c. 1977 – July 5, 2008) was a male giant panda who briefly stayed at the San Diego Zoo. Bai Yun was artificially inseminated with Shi Shi's sperm, resulting in the birth of Hua Mei, the first panda to survive to adulthood in the United States. He was replaced by Gao Gao as Bai Yun's mate in 2003 and sent back to China after veterinarians deemed Shi Shi too old to be part of the mating program.

== Life ==
Shi Shi was born around 1977 in the wild in Sichuan, China, and was rescued in 1992. He was rehabilitated and sent to the San Diego Zoo as the mate for Bai Yun on September 10, 1996, making them the first pandas sent to California, but he proved uninterested in mating. To prevent the two pandas from fighting, Bai Yun was artificially inseminated with Shi Shi's sperm in 1999, and, on August 21, she gave birth to Hua Mei, who was the first giant panda born in the United States to grow into adulthood.

Veterinarians eventually determined that Shi Shi was much older than was originally assumed, and in 2003, he was sent back to China and replaced as Bai Yun's mate by Gao Gao, with whom she gave birth to five additional cubs. Shi Shi lived out his remaining years in China at the Guangzhou Zoo and died on July 5, 2008. The Smithsonian National Zoo was expected to receive Shi Shi's frozen sperm after his death.

== See also ==
- List of individual giant pandas
- List of individual bears
