= Satrio Wiratama =

Male giant panda (born 2025)

- Other names: "Rio"; Li Ao
- Species: Giant panda
- Sex: Male
- Born: 27 November 2025 (age 11 months); Taman Safari, Cisarua, West Java, Indonesia
- Known for: the first giant panda born in Indonesia
- Parents: Hu Chun (mother); Cai Tao (father)
- Weight: 13.7 kg (30 lb) (six months old)

Satrio Wiratama (born 27 November 2025), also known as Rio or Li Ao, is a male giant panda. He was the first giant panda born in Indonesia, and his birth improved China–Indonesia relations. His parents, Hu Chun and Cai Tao, arrived in Indonesia due to a ten-year panda diplomacy with China. During the first six months of his life, Satrio Wiratama grew rapidly. He was intended to make his public debut at Taman Safari in late May 2026, but he did not appear until 9 June.

== Life and family ==
Satrio Wiratama was born on 27 November 2025 at Taman Safari in Cisarua, West Java, Indonesia, to mother Hu Chun and father Cai Tao, who were 15 years old at the time of his birth. His parents arrived in Indonesia in September 2017 as part of a ten-year panda diplomacy with China. He lives 70 kilometres (43 mi) from Jakarta with his parents in an enclosure that The Independent described as "palace-like".

Satrio is the first giant panda born in Indonesia, and the first giant panda to be born outside China in three years. His birth symbolises strong China–Indonesia relations, according to Raja Juli Antoni, the Minister of Forestry.

The name Satrio Wiratama, which was chosen by the president of Indonesia, Prabowo Subianto, following a request by Taman Safari, means "warrior, noble, brave and virtuous". Furthermore, according to Taman Safari, Satrio's name represents China and Indonesia's shared dedication to preserving endangered species. Satrio was also nicknamed "Rio".

At six months old, Satrio weighed 13.7 kilograms, and he was reported to be rapidly developing both physically and mentally. He was initially supposed to make his public debut at Taman Safari in late May 2026, but he did not appear until 9 June.
