= Wolong National Nature Reserve =

National nature reserve in Sichuan, China

- Wolong Special Administrative Region
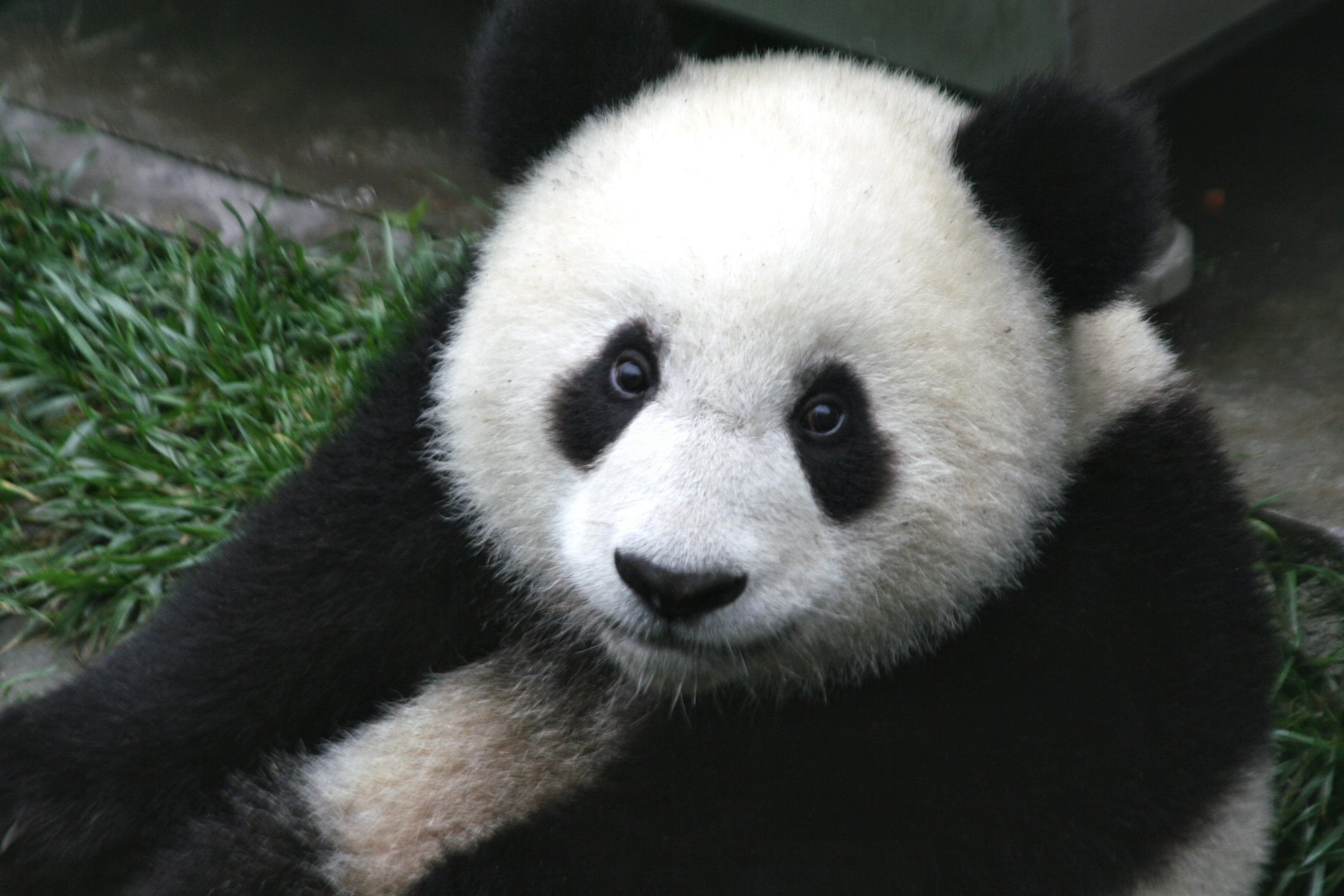
- Giant panda cub at the Panda Breeding Centre of Wolong National Nature Reserve

- Location within Sichuan
- Location: Wenchuan County, Sichuan
- Nearest city: Chengdu
- Coordinates: 31.02°N 103.10°E
- Area: c. 2,000 km^{2} (770 sq mi)
- Established: 1963
- Website: wolongpanda.com.cn

Wolong National Nature Reserve
- Simplified Chinese: 卧龙国家级自然保护区
- Traditional Chinese: 臥龍國家級自然保護區
Transcriptions
Standard Mandarin
- Hanyu Pinyin: Wòlóng Guójiā Jí Zìrán Bǎohù Qū

Wolong Special Administrative Region
- Simplified Chinese: 四川省汶川卧龙特别行政区
- Traditional Chinese: 四川省汶川臥龍特別行政區
Transcriptions
Standard Mandarin
- Hanyu Pinyin: Sìchuān Shěng Wènchuān Wòlóng Tèbié Xíngzhèngqū

Wolong National Nature Reserve (from Chinese 卧龙; wòlóng; 'crouching dragon'), officially known as Wolong Special Administrative Region, is a national protected area in Wenchuan County in China. It was established in 1963 with an initial size of about 200 km^{2} (77 sq mi). It was expanded in 1975 to an area of about 2,000 km^{2} (770 sq mi) in the Qionglai Mountains region. It hosts over 4,000 species. In 2006, it became a UNESCO World Heritage Site.

According to China's Third National Giant Panda Survey, about 150 wild giant pandas live in Wolong National Nature Reserve. The reserve is also a home to many other endangered species including snow leopards, red pandas, golden snub-nosed monkeys and white-lipped deer. Before the devastating 2008 Sichuan earthquake, Wolong received up to 200,000 visitors every year.

The reserve became part of the Giant Panda National Park in 2020.

== Background ==
In June 1980, the Chinese government started its cooperation with the World Wide Fund for Nature, and the "China Conservation and Research Center for the Giant Panda" (CCRCGP) was established to ensure a future for the giant pandas. The aim was to increase the number of pandas in captive-breeding programs, however with the ultimate goal to return a larger number of pandas to their original, natural habitats. When the cooperation started giant pandas were still listed as an endangered species by the IUCN. In 2016, the IUCN reclassified the giant panda from being "endangered" to the new classification "vulnerable", affirming decade-long efforts to save the panda.

== Location ==
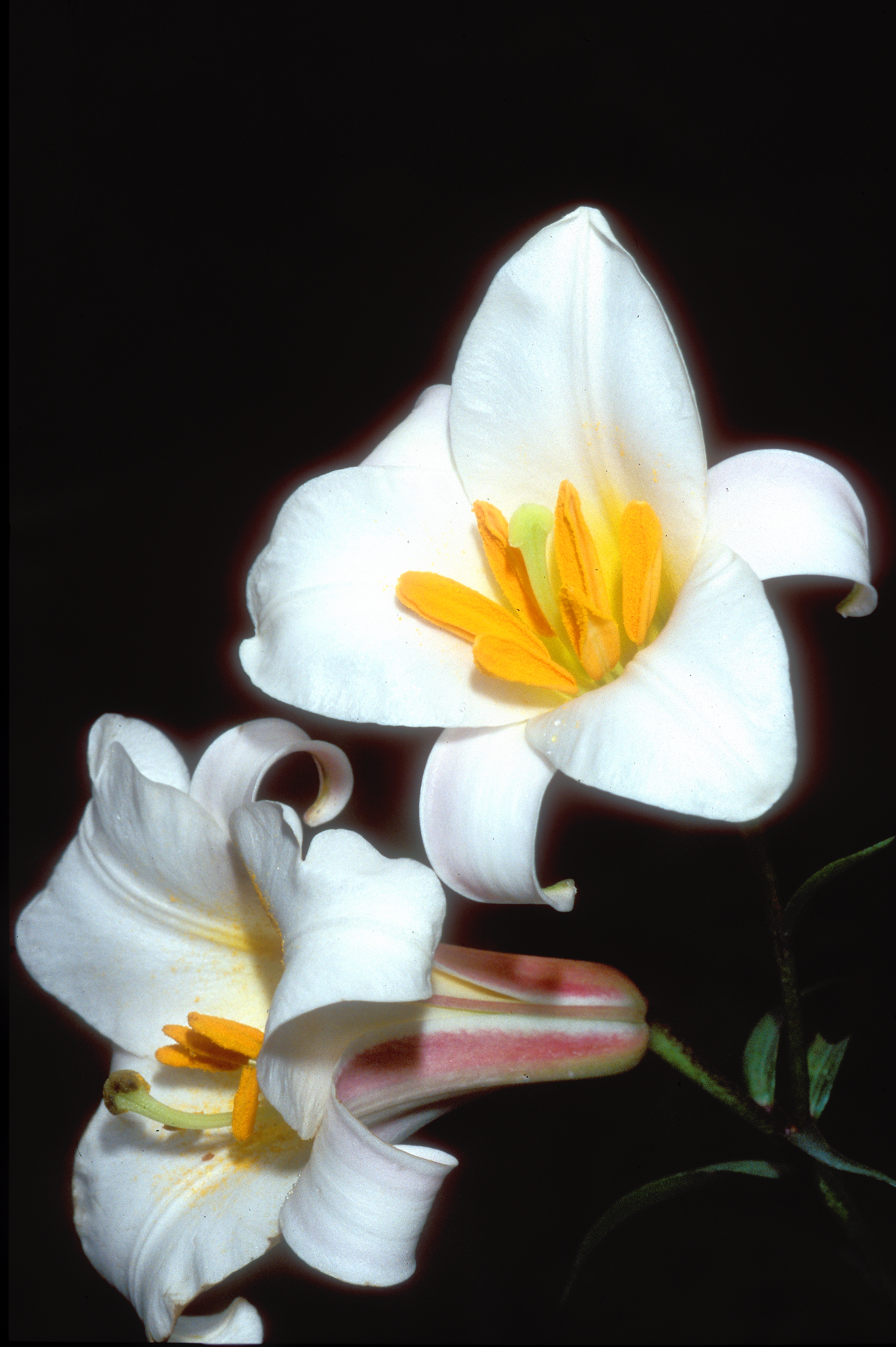
Lilium regale, a local native flower

A mountain stream runs through the Wolong Valley (where the reserve is); the stream is heavily armoured with boulders and smaller rounded stones. Stream waters are rather alkaline with pH levels in the range of 8.91. (Hogan, 2007) Water quality turbidity is quite high due to extensive sand and gravel mining in stream.

According to a 2001 study, the rate of destruction is higher after the reserve's creation than before its creation due to the increase of tourism.

== Breeding program ==
The China Conservation and Research Center for the Giant Panda engages in global cooperations with 16 zoos in 14 countries, providing the world's largest platform for the scientific research regarding the giant pandas. By 2019, a total of 19 other pandas have been returned to China.

Giant pandas from Wolong have been loaned to zoos all over the world to ensure breeding success. Bai Yun, who was the first female panda born at the Nature Reserve in 1991, was the first panda to be loaned to a zoo outside of China. From 1996 until 2019, she lived at the San Diego Zoo in California, where she gave birth to six cubs. When the conservation loan ended, 27-year-old Bai Yun was returned to China together with her last-born old son, Xiao Liwu.

== Fauna ==
The most famous species of the reserve is the giant panda. Other mammals include Ussuri dhole, Asiatic black bear, Asiatic golden cat, clouded leopard, red panda, hog badger and yellow-throated marten. Hooved mammals are represented by Sichuan takin, wild boar, musk deer, mainland serow, Chinese goral, tufted deer and sambar deer. Other noticeable mammals include golden snub-nosed monkey, Tibetan macaque, complex-toothed flying squirrel, bamboo rat, and porcupines. Because the reserve comprises different altitudes, it includes tropical and temperate climate zones and harbors species typically for the tropics, like sambar deer as well as species from temperate regions, like white-lipped deer, snow leopard and Turkestan lynx. In 2018, a leopard was photographed by a camera trap at an elevation of 4,080 m (13,390 ft). The same camera, installed in 2017, also captured images of snow leopards.

== 2008 earthquake ==
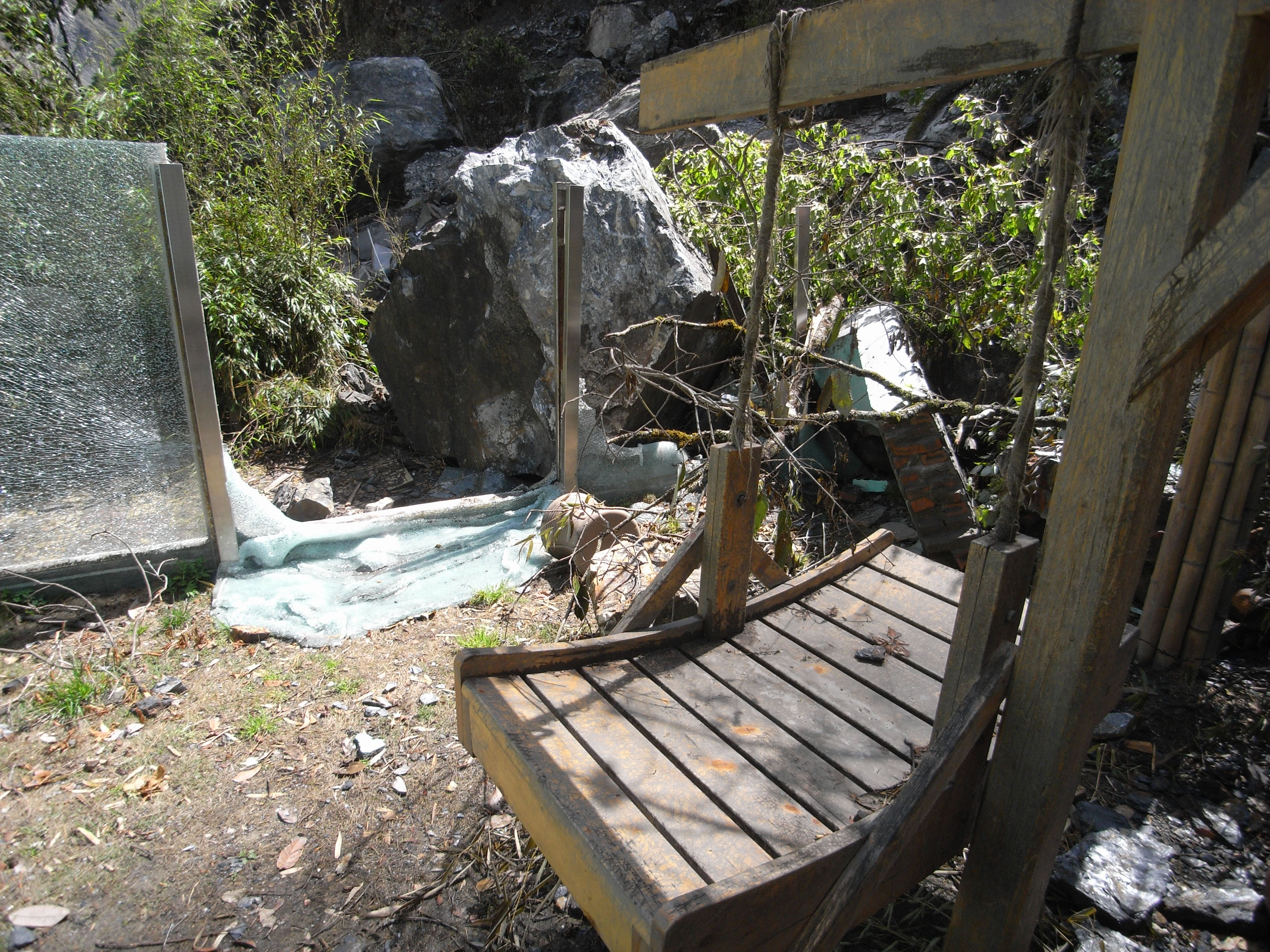
Many giant panda houses were broken in the 2008 Sichuan earthquake

The region, including the Panda Research Center, was largely devastated by the catastrophic May 12, 2008 Sichuan earthquake, though the captive giant pandas were initially reported to be safe. Immediately after the quake, officials were unable to contact the reserve. Five security guards at the reserve were killed by the earthquake. Six pandas escaped after their enclosures were damaged. By May 20, two pandas at the reserve were found to be injured, while the search continued for another two adult pandas that went missing after the quake. On May 28, 2008, nine-year-old Mao Mao (mother of five) was still missing. On June 9, she was found dead as a result of being crushed by a wall in her enclosure.

The giant pandas were relocated to the Bifengxia Panda Base, which is also managed by the China Panda Protection and Research Center. Starting in 2012, they were relocated to the new Shenshuping Panda Center.

== See also ==
- Bifengxia Panda Base
- Chengdu Research Base of Giant Panda Breeding
- Dengsheng
- Sichuan Giant Panda Sanctuaries
- Wildlife of China
