= Taishan =

Taishan may refer to:

- Mount Tai or Taishan (泰山), Shandong, China
- Taishan District, Tai'an (泰山区), named after the Mount Tai, a district in Tai'an, Shandong, China
- Taishan, Guangdong (台山市), a county-level city of Jiangmen, Guangdong, China
  - Greater Taishan Region (台山地区), a region in Guangdong consisting of the cities of Taishan, Kaiping, Xinhui, Jiangmen, Enping and Heshan
  - Taishan railway station (Guangdong) (台山站)
  - Taishan Nuclear Power Plant (台山核电站) in Taishan, Guangdong province, China
- Taishan District, New Taipei (泰山區), a district in New Taipei, Taiwan; was known as "Taishan Township" until 2010

== Subdistricts in China ==
- Taishan Subdistrict, Nanjing (泰山街道), in Pukou District, Nanjing, Jiangsu
- Taishan Subdistrict, Xuzhou (泰山街道), in Quanshan District, Xuzhou, Jiangsu
- Taishan Subdistrict, Jilin City (泰山街道), in Fengman District, Jilin City, Jilin Province

== Towns in China ==
- Taishan, Henan (太山), in Huojia County, Henan
- Taishan, Baicheng (太山), in Da'an, Jilin

== Townships in China ==
- Taishan Township, Gansu (泰山乡), in Liangdang County, Gansu
- Taishan Township, Jiangxi (泰山乡), in Anfu County, Jiangxi

== See also ==
- Sacrifice to Taishan
- Daishan County, Zhejiang, China
- Taishanese, a dialect of Yue Chinese and a sister dialect of Guangzhou Cantonese
- Taishanese people, the people who reside in or have ancestry in the Greater Taishan Region
- Shandong Taishan F.C., a Chinese football club based in Jinan, Shandong
- Taishan Commandery, historical commandery of China
- Tai Shan (disambiguation)
- Taishang (disambiguation)
