= Tai Shan =

Tai Shan may refer to:

- Mount Tai, a mountain in Shandong Province, China
- Tai Shan (giant panda), a giant panda born at the Smithsonian's National Zoo in 2005
- Tai Shan (978), a Chinese military Type 071 amphibious transport dock
- "Tai Shan", a song on the album Hold Your Fire by Rush
- Tai Shan (大山), a 291m tall hill on Lantau Island, in Hong Kong

== People with the given name ==
- Chang Tai-shan, Taiwanese baseball player
- Tai-Shan Schierenberg, British painter

== See also ==
- Taishan (disambiguation)
