= Baoli (disambiguation) =

Baoli or Bao Li may refer to,

- Bao Li, giant panda
- Quercus serrata (jolcham oak), known as baoli in Chinese
- Stepwells, for which one of the names in Hindi are baori or baoli
