= Lisa Marie Stevens =

Curator

- Citizenship: American
- Education: Michigan State University
- Known for: Giant panda and primate programs
- Scientific career
- Workplaces: Smithsonian Institution's National Zoo

Lisa Marie Stevens is an American retired zoologist who served as the senior curator for mammals, and managed both the giant panda program and the primate program, at the Smithsonian Institution's National Zoo. She worked at the National Zoo from 1978 to her retirement in 2011. Stevens managed the National Zoo's panda breeding program as early as 1987, but rose to national prominence following the birth of panda cub Tai Shan in 2005.

Although internationally known as "the Panda Lady," she was also responsible for the zoo's primates, including gorillas, orangutans, gibbons, and macaques. Stevens is included in the American Association for the Advancement of Science's Spotlight on African American Scientists.

== Early life and education ==
Stevens' father was in the United States Army, so she moved around during her childhood. She lived in Okinawa, Japan, and Bangkok, Thailand where she came in contact with various animals. Stevens said, "I was that kid who, at age 3 and 4, was picking up caterpillars and holding snakes." When she was ten years old, Stevens began taking horseback riding lessons. Of horseback riding, Stevens said, "I think that was my earliest interest in veterinarian medicine, just by watching the vet work on the horses at the polo club there in Bangkok."

Stevens attended high school in Washington DC and earned her Bachelor of Science degree in Zoology/Pre-Veterinary Medicine in 1977 from Michigan State University. She also completed the Association of Zoos and Aquariums' Professional Management Development for Zoo and Aquarium Personnel in 1986.

== Career ==
After graduating from university, Stevens moved to Washington, D.C., in 1978 and began working as an animal keeper at the National Zoo. In 1981, she was promoted to management. She began managing the primate program in 1981 and the giant panda program in 1987. Part of her responsibilities included "daily operations, personnel, budget, long-range planning, record keeping, research, education, exhibit design, and construction."

In 2005, Lisa Stevens was the Assistant Curator overseeing the giant panda program when Tai Shan was born; Tai Shan was the first surviving panda born at the National Zoo and the third panda cub born in the US. She was the primary spokeswoman for interviews about Tai Shan's birth and her colloquial descriptions of his early adventures made her a popular interviewee. She was profiled in the Chicago Tribune and featured in the Animal Planet documentaries A Panda is Born (2005) and Baby Panda's First Year (2006), which were packaged together in a 2008 re-release.

Stevens participates in the Association of Zoos and Aquariums' Species Survival Plan for several species. She also co-founded and is on the Board of Directors of Beads for Education, Inc., which funds the education of more than 300 girls in Kenya.
