= Taishang (disambiguation) =

Taishang may refer to:

- Taishang (台商), an informal term for Taiwanese businesspeople in mainland China
- Taishang (太上, 405–410), era name used by Murong Chao, emperor of Southern Yan
- Taishang, Jilin (台上), a town in Ji'an, Jilin, China

== See also ==
- Taishan (disambiguation)
