= Roewe D6 =

Battery electric compact sedan

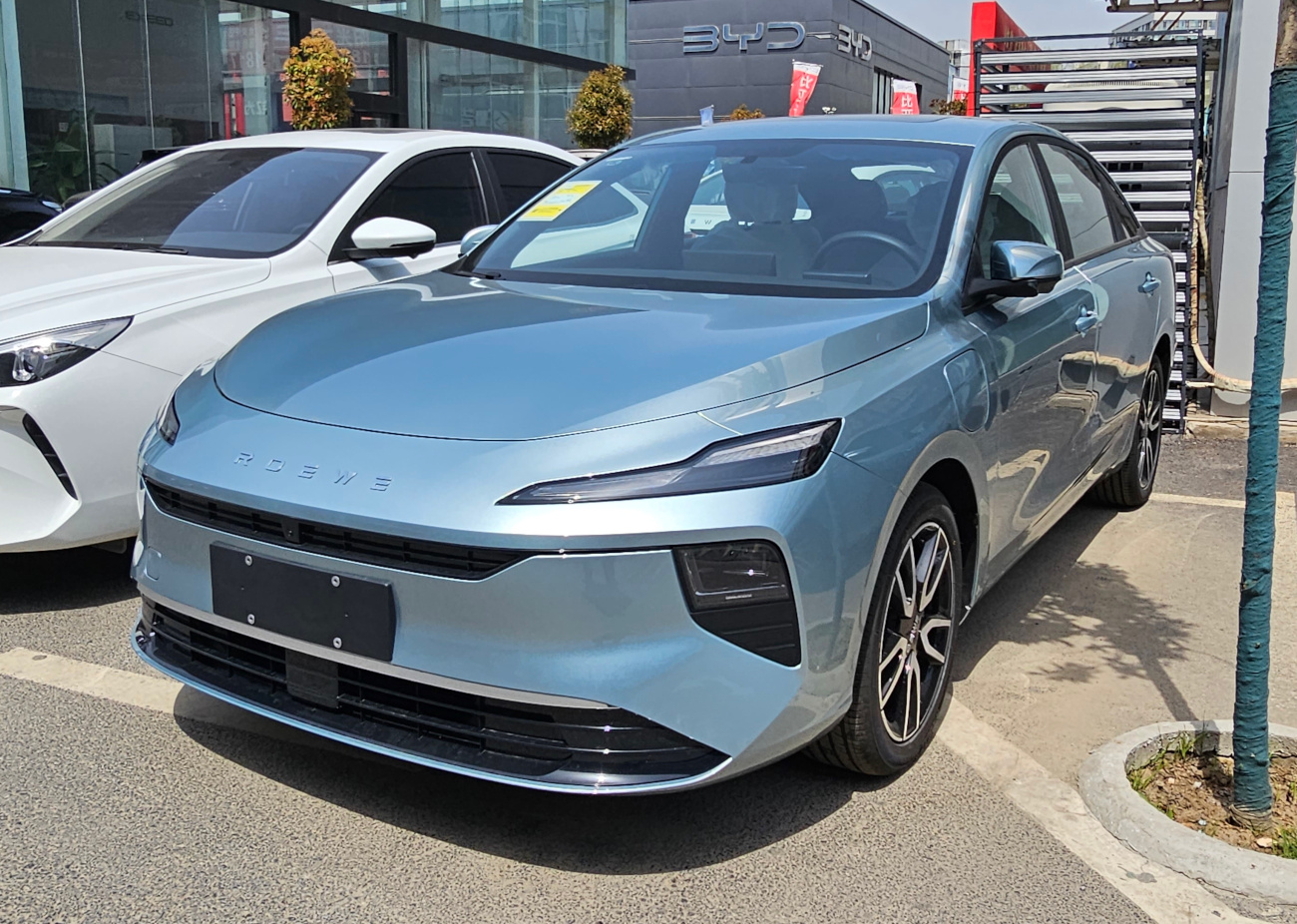

Overview
- Manufacturer: Roewe (SAIC Motor)
- Model code: AP4ER
- Also called: Roewe E6
- Production: 2025–present
- Assembly: China: Pukou, Nanjing

Body and chassis
- Class: Compact car (C)
- Body style: 4-door sedan
- Layout: Front-motor, front-wheel-drive
- Platform: Modular Scalable Platform / Nebula (SAIC E3)
- Related: Roewe i6

Powertrain
- Electric motor: TZ180XS1001 permanent magnet synchronous
- Power output: 129–143 hp (96–107 kW; 131–145 PS)
- Battery: 42.8 kWh LFP SAIC-CATL; 53.95 kWh LFP SAIC-CATL
- Electric range: 450–520 km (280–323 mi) (CLTC)

Dimensions
- Wheelbase: 2,750 mm (108.3 in)
- Length: 4,792 mm (188.7 in)
- Width: 1,828 mm (72.0 in)
- Height: 1,496 mm (58.9 in)

The Roewe D6 is a battery electric compact sedan produced by SAIC Motor under the Roewe brand since 2025.

== Overview ==
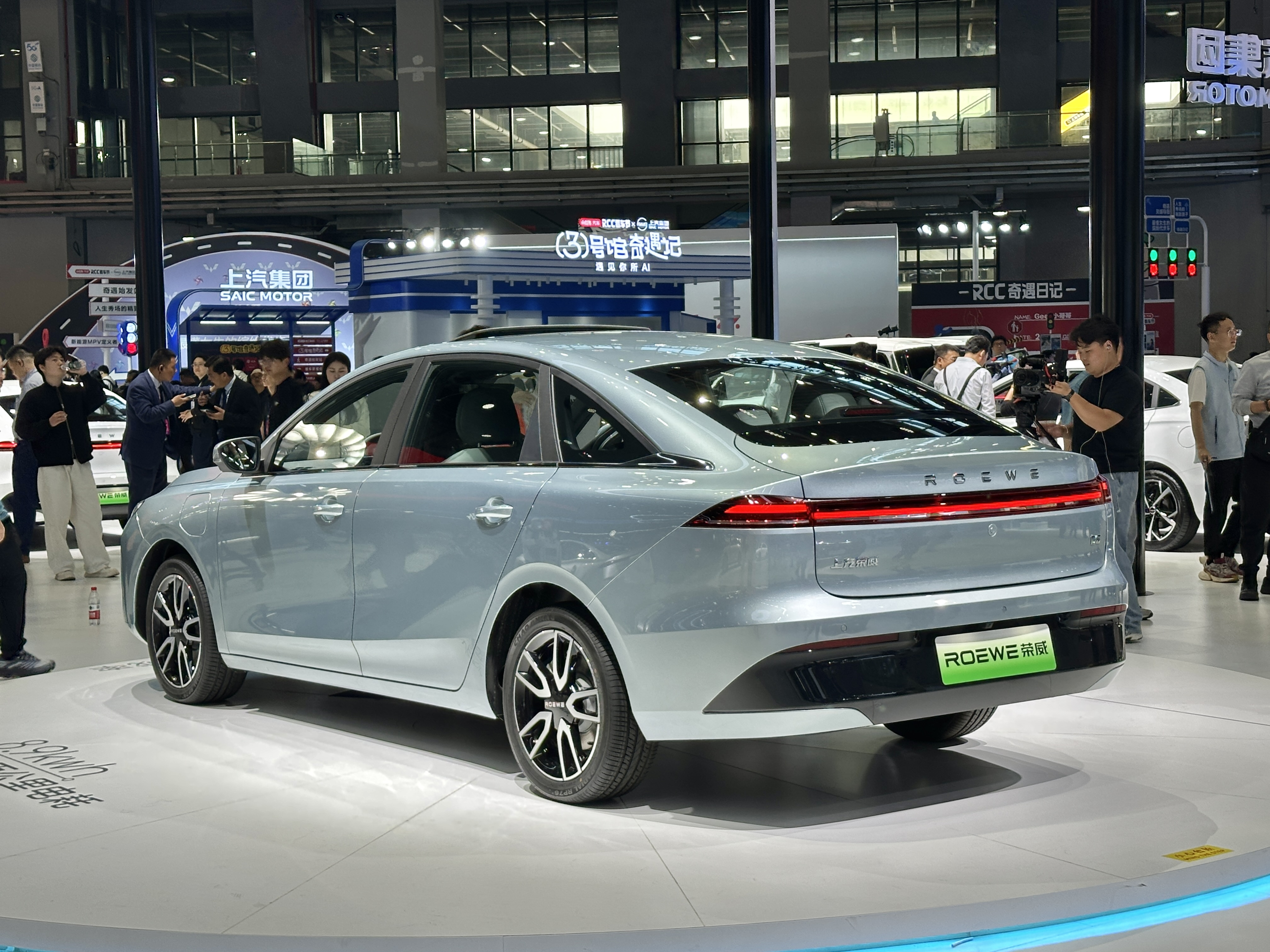
Rear view

In the spring of 2025, The Roewe introduced a new, affordable compact electric car in the form of the D6 sedan. The car features the Chinese company new styling, distinguished by sleek, soaring lines. The front fascia features double-row headlights shaped like inverted boomerangs, while the rear end is crowned by a narrow light strip.

The passenger compartment features a minimalist design, with a high center tunnel featuring two inductive phone charging trays. A digital instrument cluster sits in front of the two-spoke steering wheel, and a centrally located 12.8-inch touchscreen infotainment system.

== Specifications ==
The D6 went on sale exclusively as an electric vehicle in two variants. The entry-level model developed 127 hp (95 kW; 129 PS) and, thanks to a 42.8 kWh battery, offered a range of up to 450 kilometres (280 mi) according to the CLTC test cycle. The top-of-the-line model, with 141 hp (105 kW; 143 PS), was paired with a 53.9 kWh battery, allowing for a range of up to 520 kilometres (323 mi) on a single charge. Shortly after its premiere, the car set a Guinness World Record for the lowest energy consumption for a mass-produced pure electric car driving through the Qinghai-Tibet Highway, consuming approximately 9.125 kWh/100 km over a distance of 1,959.9 kilometres (1,217.8 mi).

== Sales ==
Year	China
2025	21,527
