= Bei Bei =

Giant panda at the US National Zoo (born 2015)

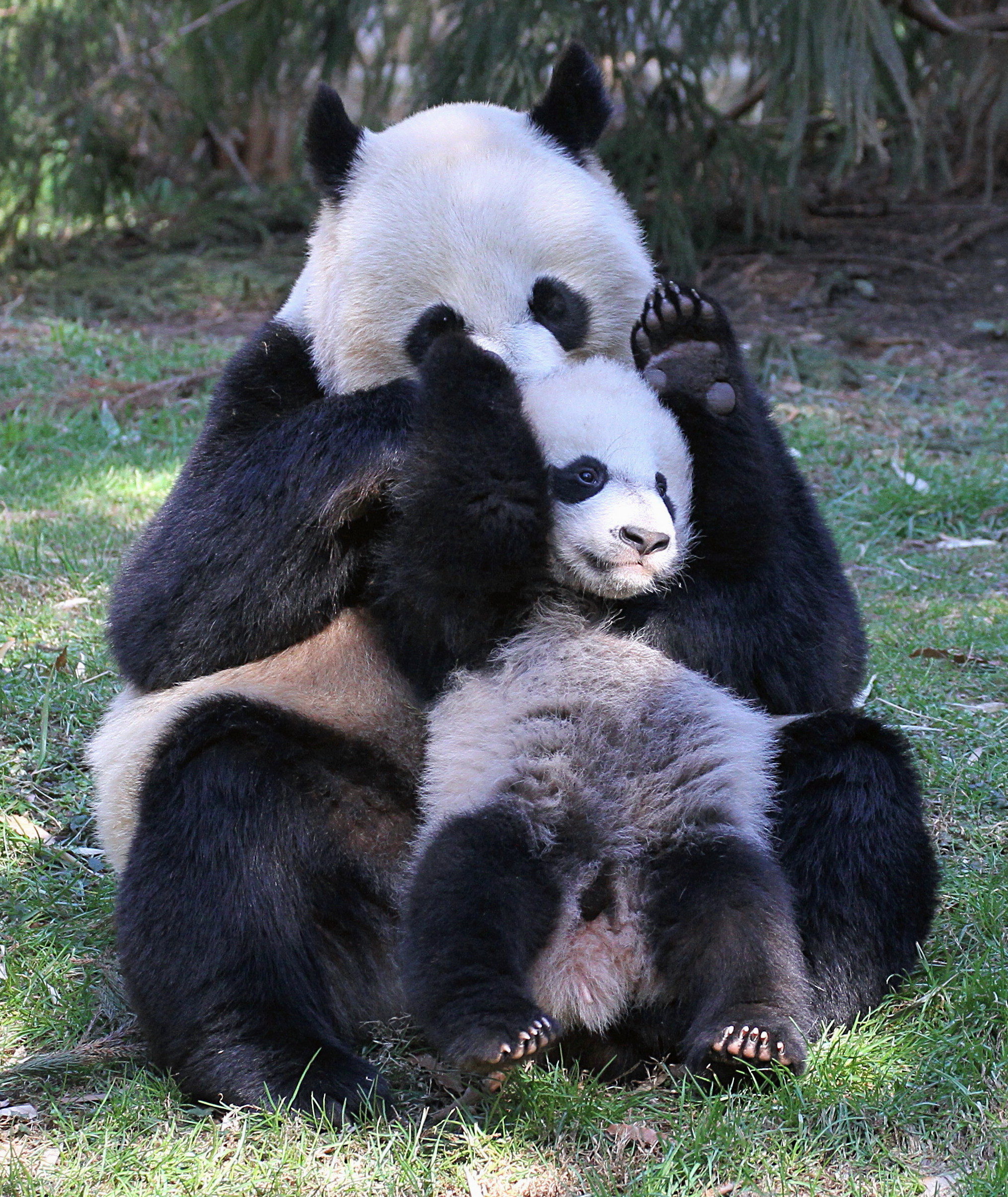
- Bei Bei playing with his mother Mei Xiang in February 2016
- Species: Giant panda
- Sex: Male
- Born: August 22, 2015 (age 11); National Zoological Park, Washington, D.C., United States
- Residence: Bifengxia Panda Base, Ya'an, China
- Parents: Mei Xiang, Tian Tian
- Weight: 240 lb (109 kg) (as of November 21, 2019)
- Named after: Treasure

Bei Bei (/beɪ beɪ/ BAY BAY; simplified Chinese: 贝贝; traditional Chinese: 貝貝; pinyin: Bèibèi; lit. 'treasure'; born August 22, 2015) is a male giant panda bear who was born and lived at the National Zoo in Washington, D.C., in the United States. He was part of US-China relations panda diplomacy, and was sent to the People's Republic of China on November 19, 2019, at the age of 4. He is currently at the Ya'an Bifengxia Base of the Giant Panda Conservation and Research Center in southwest Sichuan. He is the brother of Tai Shan, Bao Bao, and Xiao Qi Ji. When Bei Bei reached adulthood, he became part of a breeding program that was focused on removing the giant panda species from the endangered species list. As of November 2024, Bei Bei lives at the Ya'an Bifengxia Base of the Giant Panda Conservation and Research Center in southwest Sichuan.

== Birth ==
Bei Bei was born on August 22, 2015, at 10:07 pm, together with a twin who was born at 5:35 pm that died from pneumonia 4 days after their birth. His mother is Mei Xiang. His father, via artificial insemination, is National Zoo panda Tian Tian. As of November 21, 2019, he weighed 240 pounds (108 kg).

== Naming ==
On September 25, 2015, five weeks after the birth of the baby panda, he was named "Bei Bei" by Michelle Obama and Peng Liyuan, the first ladies of the United States and the People's Republic of China, respectively. The name was selected from a list of suggestions by officials from the National Zoo and the Wolong National Nature Reserve in Sichuan, China. The National Zoo preferred the name Ping Ping (平平, "peace"), while "Bei Bei" was the staff choice at Wolong; doubled names are usually chosen because they are diminutive in Chinese. The first ladies revealed the name in both English and Mandarin, assisted by third-grade students from a Chinese-immersion elementary school in Washington, D.C. The name means "precious" or "treasure", the same as his sister Bao Bao born two years earlier in 2013. Zoo director Dennis Kelly admitted that the name is likely to give rise to jokes and wordplay linking the name to (Chinese: 宝贝; pinyin: bǎobèi), meaning "baby".

Before the naming ceremony, Kelly said, "It's a very exciting day because it celebrates more than four decades of research and success on the giant panda, and to have it recognized by the two first ladies is an honor."

== Move to China ==
Bei Bei made his first public viewing on January 16, 2016. After 3 and a half years viewed at the National Zoo in America, he was sent to China to participate in a breeding program. On November 19, 2019, Bei Bei departed the National Zoo with a veterinarian and his life-long keeper on the FedEx Panda Express, an aircraft made for traveling pandas, to China. He landed in Chengdu the following day, and spent 30 days in quarantine before moving to the Chengdu Panda bases.

In 2021, Bei Bei became the subject of a children's book titled Bei Bei Goes Home, written by Cheryl Bardoe. The book describes his return from America to China and what it means for conservation efforts.

== Adult life ==
Bei Bei turned 9 years old in 2024. Giant pandas achieve sexual maturity between the ages of 4 and 8. It has been reported that upon reaching this milestone, he would become part of a breeding program credited with increasing panda populations until they could be removed from the endangered species list. Some scientists assert that, although the number of pandas in captive breeding programs like this one is growing, multiple threats to wild pandas still exist. As of November 2024, Bei Bei lives at the Ya'an Bifengxia Base of the Giant Panda Conservation and Research Center in southwest Sichuan.

== See also ==
- List of individual giant pandas
- List of individual bears
