= Mei Xiang and Tian Tian =

Giant pandas

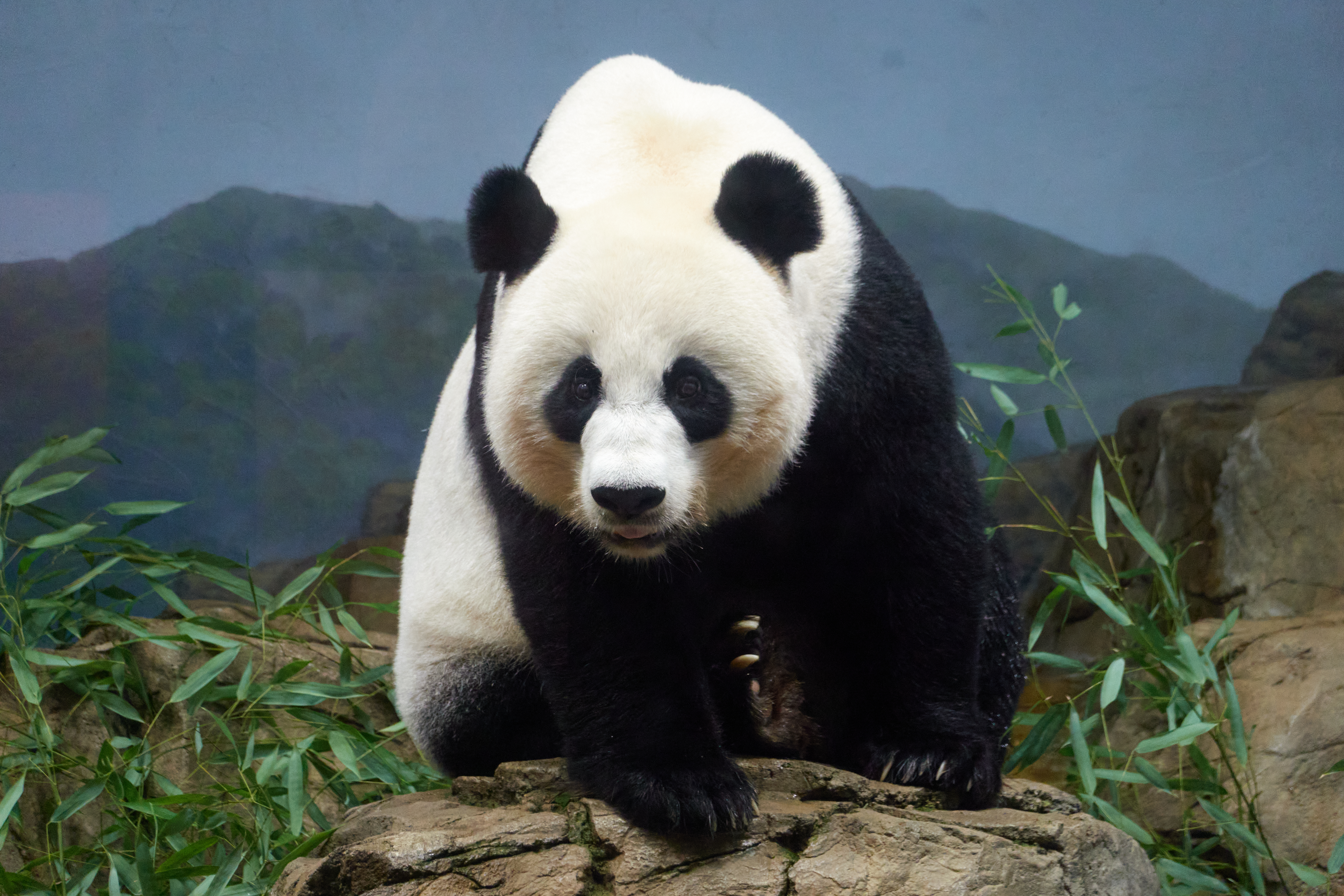
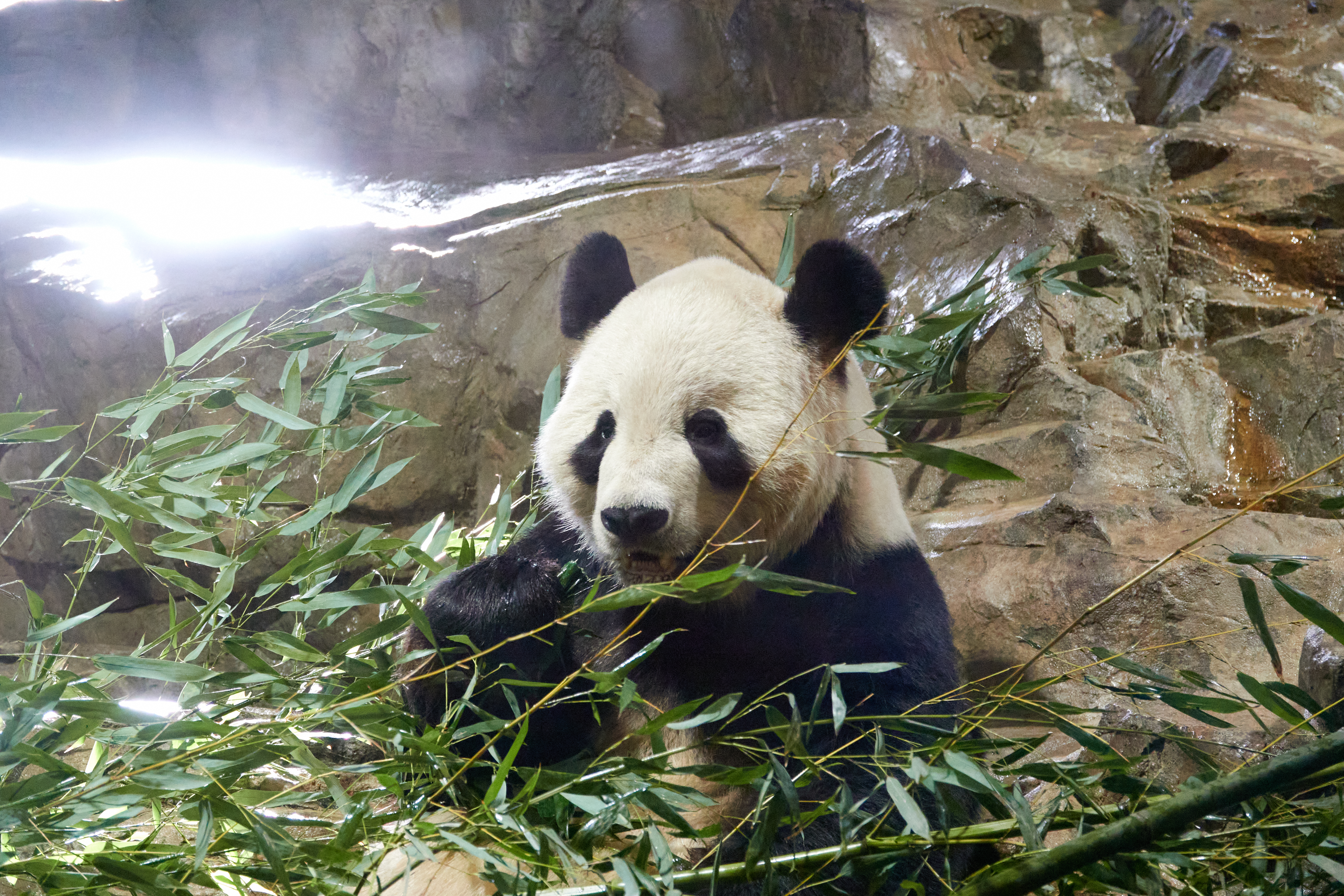
- Mei Xiang at the Smithsonian National Zoo in August 2021 Tian Tian at the Smithsonian National Zoo in February 2022
- Species: Giant panda (Ailuropoda melanoleuca)
- Born: China Conservation and Research Center for the Giant Panda, Wolong National Nature Reserve, Sichuan, China
- Owner: Government of China
- Residence: National Zoo, Washington, DC (formerly); Chengdu, China (since 2023)
- Offspring: 7, including Tai Shan, Bao Bao, Bei Bei, and Xiao Qi Ji
- Mei Xiang
- Sex: Female
- Born: 美香; July 22, 1998 (age 28)
- Parents: Lin Nan (father); Xue Xue (mother)
- Named after: Beautiful fragrance
- Tian Tian
- Sex: Male
- Born: 添添; August 27, 1997 (age 29)
- Parents: Pan Pan (father); Yong Ba (mother)

Mei Xiang (Note: Chinese: 美香; pinyin: Měi Xiāng; lit. 'beautiful fragrance') (born July 22, 1998) and Tian Tian (Note: Chinese: 添添; pinyin: Tiān Tiān; lit. 'More and More') (born August 27, 1997) are two giant pandas who lived at the National Zoo in Washington D.C. starting in December 6, 2000. They are the parents of seven cubs, who were born at the National Zoo. Four of their cubs—Tai Shan, Bao Bao, Bei Bei, and Xiao Qi Ji—have survived to adulthood. Mei Xiang, Tian Tian, and Xiao Qi Ji left the National Zoo on November 8, 2023, and upon arriving in Chengdu, were subsequently quarantined.

== Early life ==
Tian Tian was born on August 27, 1997, at the China Conservation and Research Center for the Giant Panda in Wolong National Nature Reserve, Sichuan. His father was Pan Pan and his mother was Yong Ba. Mei Xiang was born on July 22, 1998, at the same location as Tian Tian. Her mother and father, Xue Xue and Lin Nan, were wild-born. Mei Xiang and Tian Tian are the National Zoo's second pair of giant pandas, having arrived on December 6, 2000.

== Offspring ==
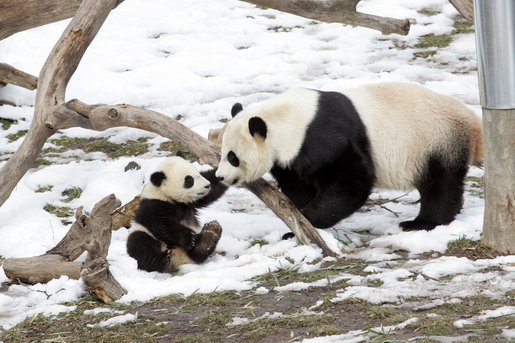
Mei Xiang and Tai Shan outside in the snow at the National Zoo in February 2006

Mei Xiang has given birth to seven cubs, four of which have survived to adulthood, and Tian Tian is a father by artificial insemination only. Their first cub, a male named Tai Shan, was born on July 9, 2005. He was the first panda cub to be born at the National Zoo and live for more than a few days. He lived at the zoo until February 4, 2010, when he moved to China, as per an agreement between the United States and China. Mei Xiang and Tian Tian were given multiple opportunities to mate naturally, and both were interested in doing so, but they have never achieved the correct positioning. This is a problem with giant pandas born in captivity. In keeping with the agreement made when Mei Xiang and Tian Tian arrived in the United States, Tai Shan left the National Zoo on February 4, 2010, to go to China. He flew there on the same flight as Mei Lan, who was born at Zoo Atlanta.

=== Artificial insemination and Bao Bao ===
Mei Xiang was artificially inseminated twice in April 2012 with Tian Tian's sperm. Zoo officials estimated her chances of pregnancy at 10% after she had five false pregnancies, in which she acted pregnant but was not. Her second cub was born on the night of September 16, 2012, and was a surprise to zookeepers. The cub, whom officials believed to have been a female, was found dead on September 23, 2012, after Mei Xiang expressed distressed, honking-like sounds. The autopsy revealed abnormal fluid in the cub's abdomen and some discoloration of some of the liver tissue, which was also hard in places. The cub's death was determined to be the result of insufficient oxygen to the liver due to underdeveloped lungs.

Bao Bao climbing a tree on April 12, 2014

On March 30, 2013, veterinarians at the National Zoo artificially inseminated Mei Xiang after natural breeding failed to occur. At approximately 5:30 p.m. local time on August 23, 2013, it was announced that Mei Xiang had given birth to her third cub. Mei Xiang gave birth again the following night, August 24, 2013, to a female stillborn cub. The surviving cub was later revealed to also be female. She was later named Bao Bao ("treasure", colloquially meaning "baby") when she turned 100 days old. She lived at the zoo until February 21, 2017, when she moved to China.

=== Bei Bei ===
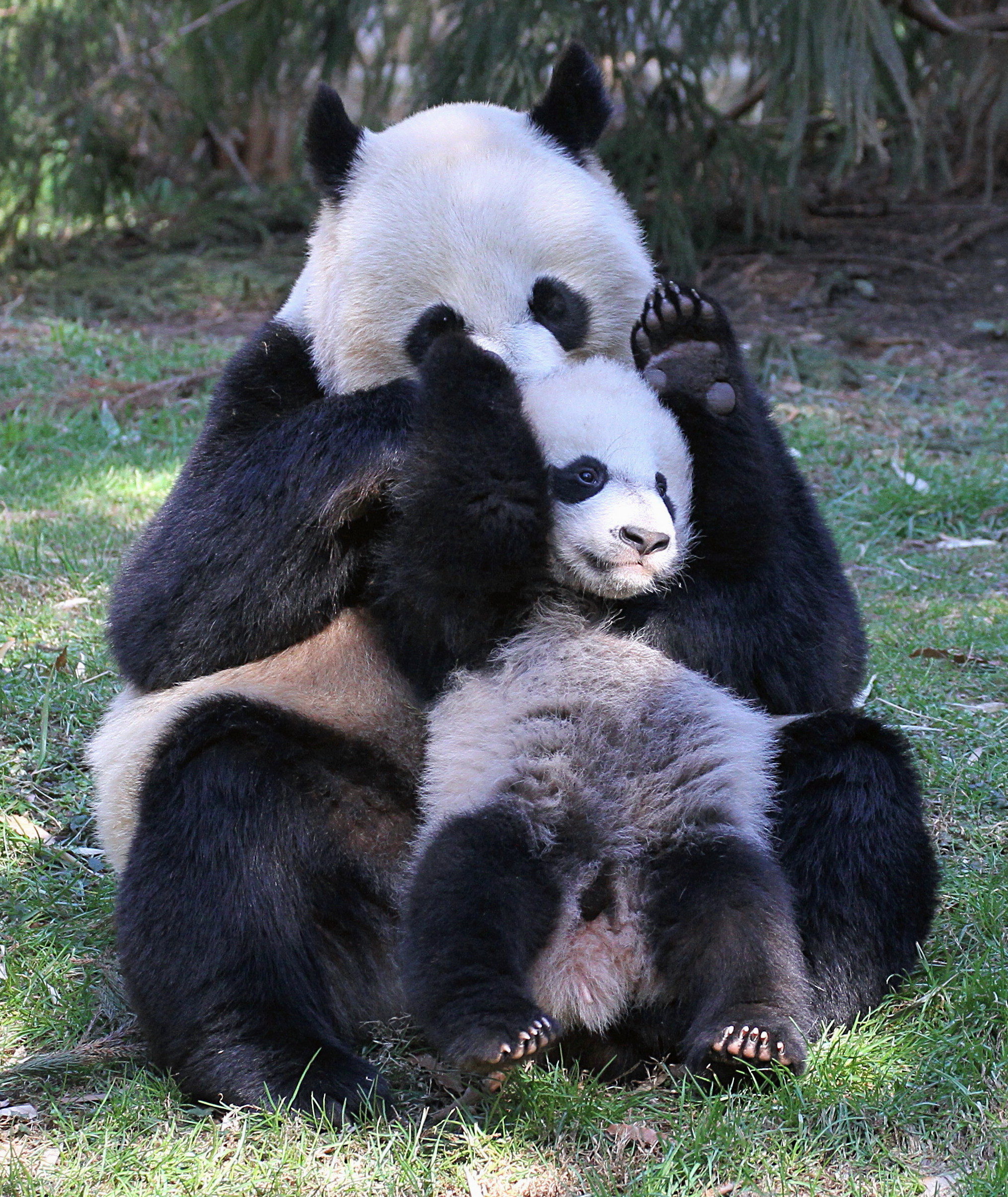
Bei Bei playing with his mother Mei Xiang in February 2016

In August 2015, veterinarians found what was believed to be a giant panda fetus on an obstetric ultrasound. She had been displaying behaviors consistent with a pregnancy or pseudopregnancy: spending more time in her den, sleeping more, cradling objects, and licking her body. She went on to give birth to two live male giant panda cubs, both fathered by Tian Tian. She gave birth to the first live cub at 5:35pm on August 22, 2015, and delivered the second, larger cub at 10:07 PM. On August 26, 2015, the National Zoo announced that the smaller of the two cubs had died. On September 25, 2015, the surviving cub was officially named Bei Bei, which means "precious, treasure". The name was chosen by First Ladies Michelle Obama of the United States and Peng Liyuan of China. Bei Bei lived at the zoo until November 19, 2019, when he moved to China.

=== Xiao Qi Ji ===
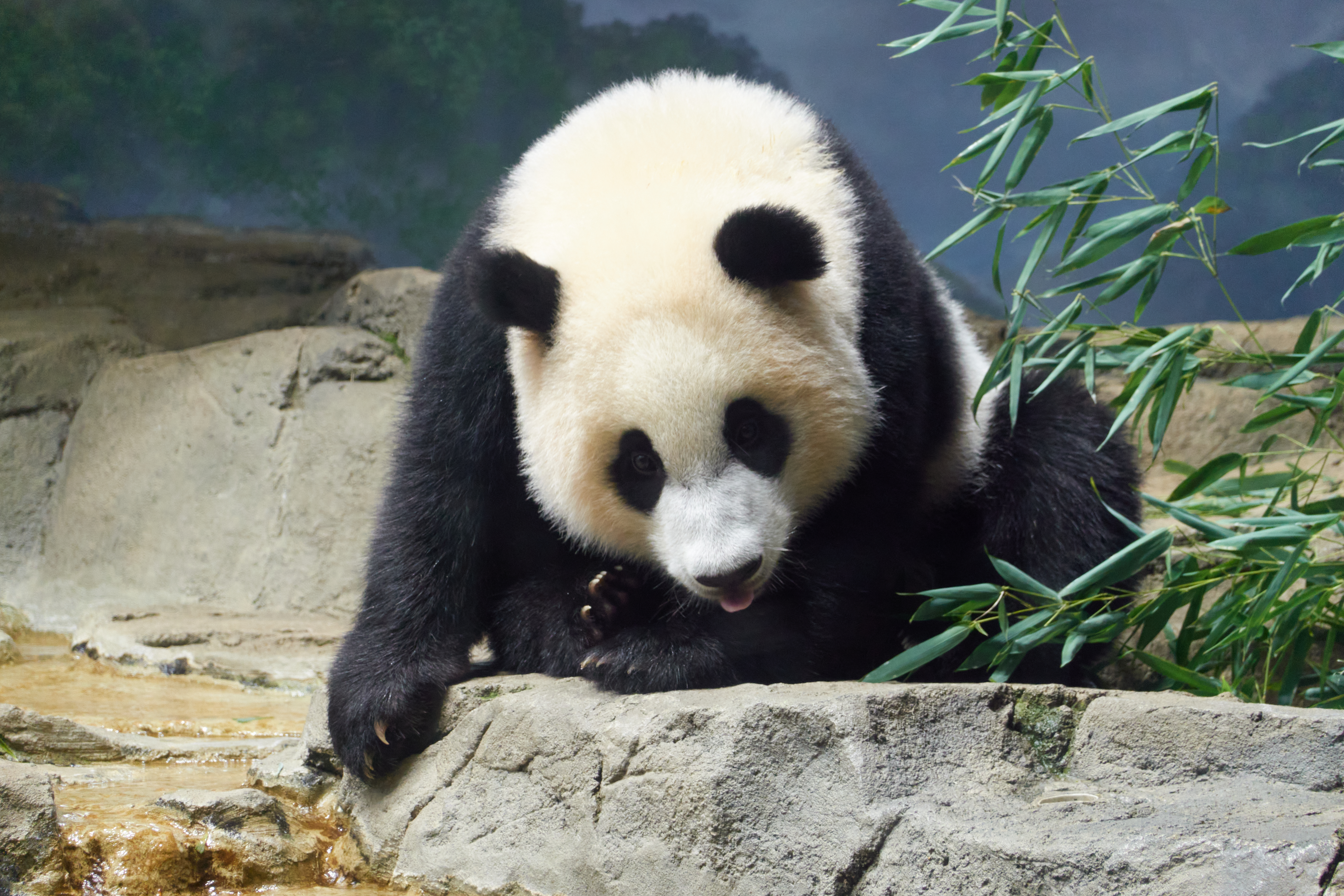
Xiao Qi Ji at the Smithsonian National Zoo in August 2021

In March 2020, shortly after the National Zoo closed due to the COVID-19 pandemic, Mei Xiang was artificially inseminated using only frozen sperm to avoid too much close contact. In August 2020, the National Zoo announced that Mei Xiang was pregnant. A few days after announcing that they had detected fetal tissue, the zoo tweeted a short video of an ultrasound showing a panda fetus. On August 21, Mei Xiang gave birth to a live male cub who was later named Xiao Qi Ji, (Note: Chinese: 小奇迹; pinyin: Xiǎo Qíjì; lit. 'Little Miracle') making her the oldest panda in the United States to give birth, at 22 years old.

Xiao Qi Ji was the first panda born via exclusively frozen sperm; according to NBC Washington, pandas are typically inseminated with a mix of frozen sperm and fresh semen. The cub's birth was broadcast live on the zoo's Panda Cam, which experienced frequent crashes due to high web traffic. By the time Xiao Qi Ji started living independently in April 2023, Mei Xiang and Tian Tian had developed diseases such as arthritis, high blood pressure, and ascites, which are common for elderly pandas. The United States and the Chinese government stopped trying to breed the two pandas.

== Departure ==
On November 8, 2023, Mei Xiang, Tian Tian and Xiao Qi Ji left the National Zoo and went on a 19-hour trip to a panda reserve in Chengdu, China. They arrived at Chengdu Shuangliu International Airport the following day, and were quarantined on November 10.

== See also ==
- List of individual giant pandas
- List of individual bears
