= Xiao Qi Ji =

Panda cub born at the National Zoo (born 2021)

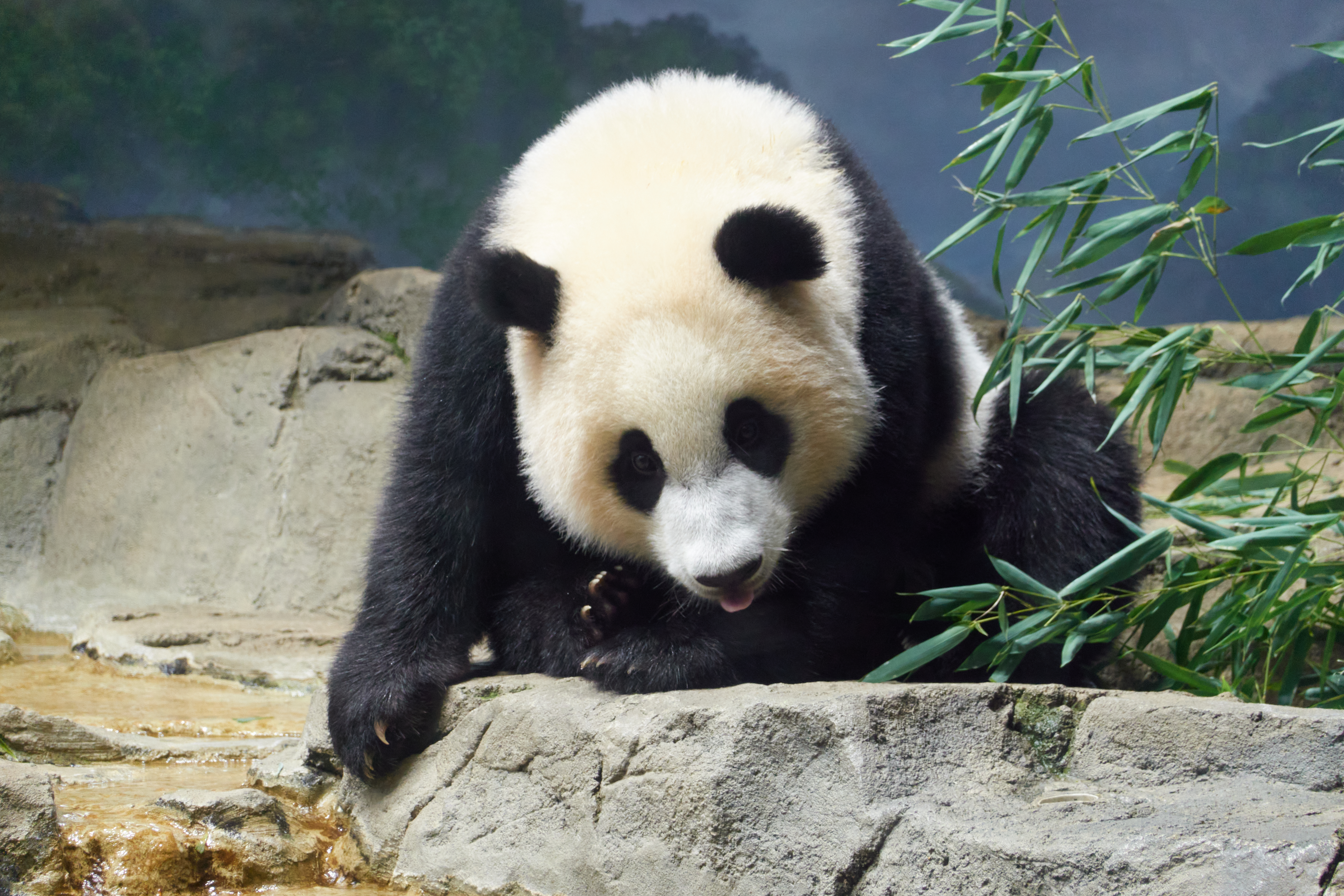
- Xiao Qi Ji at the Smithsonian National Zoo in August 2021.
- Species: Giant panda
- Sex: Male
- Born: August 21, 2020 (age 6); National Zoological Park, Washington, D.C., United States
- Residence: China
- Parents: Mei Xiang, Tian Tian
- Weight: 200 lb (91 kg)
- Named after: Little Miracle

Xiao Qi Ji (simplified Chinese: 小奇迹; traditional Chinese: 小奇蹟; pinyin: Xiǎo Qíjì, meaning "little miracle") is a male giant panda who was born at the National Zoo in Washington, D.C., on August 21, 2020. The fourth surviving cub of Mei Xiang and Tian Tian, Xiao Qi Ji is a result of an artificial insemination of Mei Xiang on March 22, 2020. Xiao Qi Ji is the youngest brother of Tai Shan, Bao Bao and Bei Bei.

== Birth ==
Xiao Qi Ji was born on August 21, 2020, at 6:35 PM to Mei Xiang and Tian Tian the National Zoo's second pair of giant pandas. With Xiao Qi Ji's birth, Mei Xiang, who is aged 22 years, set a record of being the oldest giant panda in the United States to give birth and the second oldest panda to give birth in the world. He is the fourth surviving cub of Mei Xiang and Tian Tian. He was also a part of an artificial insemination of Mei Xiang on March 22, 2020, shortly after the National Zoo temporarily closed down due to the COVID-19 pandemic.

== Naming ==
As a result of an online vote held on the Zoo's website, Xiao Qi Ji's name was chosen and revealed 100 days after his birth, on November 23, 2020. The four choices for names were 小奇迹 (Xiǎo Qíjì, meaning "little miracle"), 幸福 (Xìngfú, meaning "happy and prosperous"), 福仔 (Fú Zǎi, meaning "prosperous boy"), and 仔仔 (Zǎi Zǎi, a traditional Chinese nickname for a boy). People such as Steve Monfort, Lonnie Bunch, Cui Tiankai, Muriel Bowser, David M. Rubenstein and a group of students of the Sunshine School of Chinese Embassy gave remarks on the naming event on a video on YouTube.

== Viewing ==
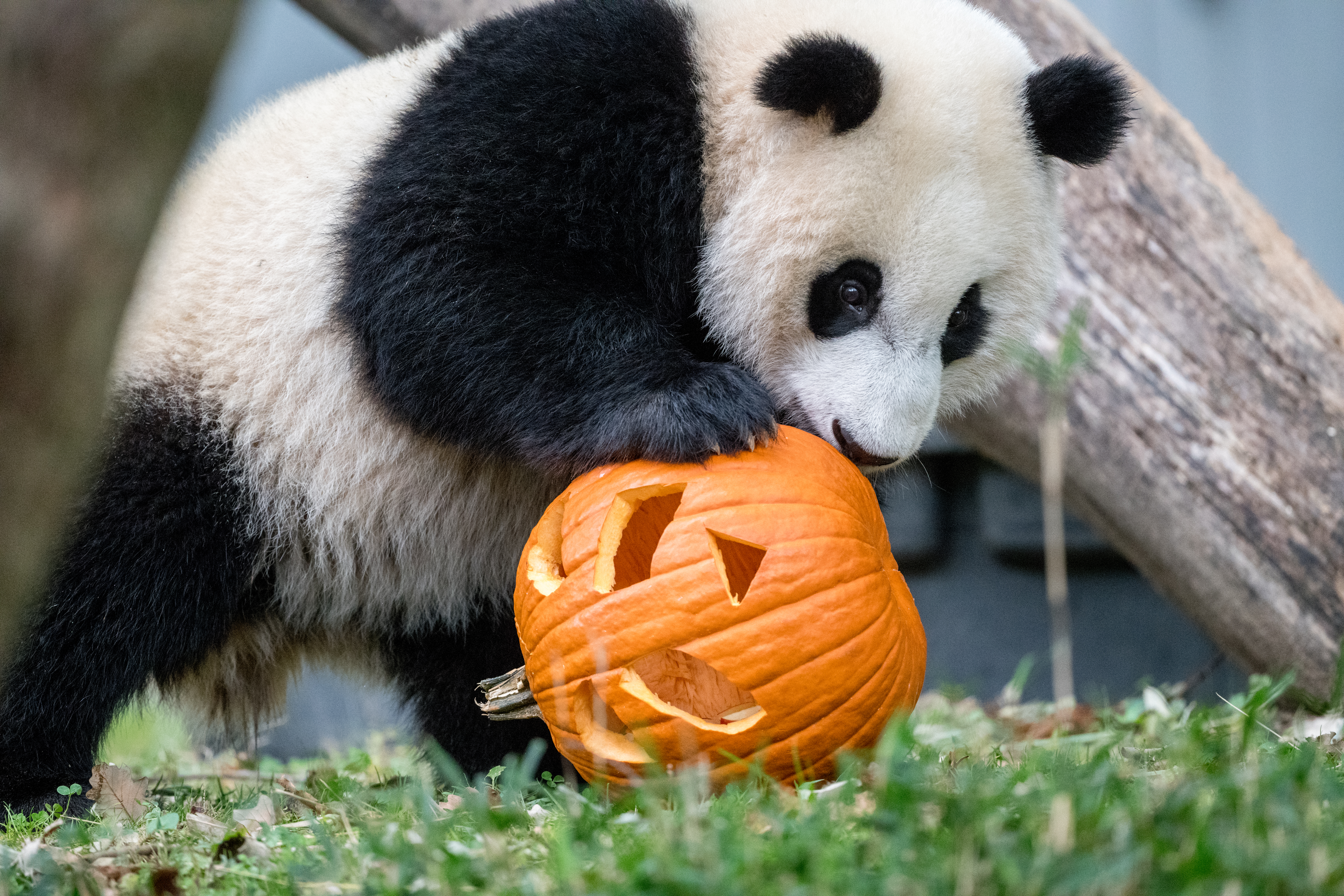
Xiao Qi Ji playing with a pumpkin in October 2021.

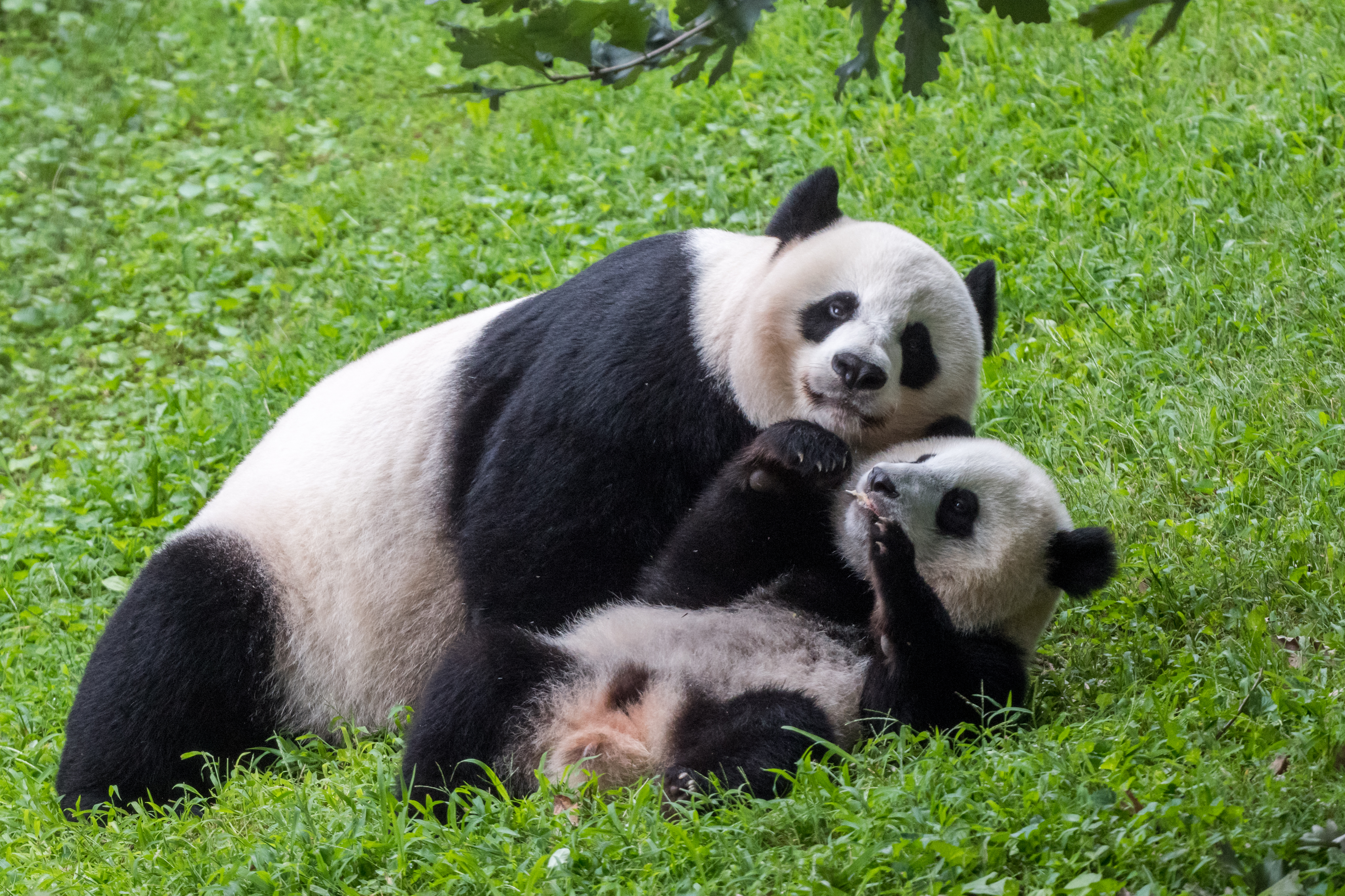
Xiao Qi Ji with his mother Mei Xiang in September 2021.

Xiao Qi Ji made his public debut on May 21, 2021, when the National Zoo reopened after closing due to the COVID-19 pandemic. On November 8, 2023, Xiao Qi Ji and his parents Mei Xiang and Tian Tian left the National Zoo and were relocated to a panda reserve in Chengdu, China.

== See also ==
- List of individual giant pandas
