= Bao Bao =

Female giant panda (born 2013)

- Bao Bao climbing a tree on April 12, 2014
- Species: Giant panda
- Sex: Female
- Born: August 23, 2013 (age 13); National Zoological Park, Washington, D.C. United States
- Residence: Wolong National Nature Reserve
- Parents: Mei Xiang, Tian Tian
- Offspring: Dun Dun (female, b. July 29, 2020), Bao Li and Bao Yuan (male twins, b. August 4, 2021)
- Named after: Treasure

Bao Bao (Note: /baʊ baʊ/, "bow bow"; Chinese: 宝宝; pinyin: Bǎobǎo) (born August 23, 2013) is a female giant panda. She lived at the National Zoo in Washington, D.C. until February 2017, when she was moved to the Chengdu Research Base of Giant Panda Breeding in China. She is located at the Wolong National Nature Reserve in Sichuan Province.

Bao Bao is the sister of Tai Shan, Bei Bei, and Xiao Qi Ji. Since returning to China, she has given birth to three cubs: Dun Dun, Bao Li, and Bao Yuan.

== Life ==
Bao Bao was born on August 23, 2013, at the National Zoo in Washington D.C. The cub of Mei Xiang and Tian Tian, Bao Bao is a result of artificial insemination of Mei Xiang on March 30, 2013. Bao Bao is the sister of Bei Bei, Tai Shan, and Xiao Qi Ji. She has two unnamed siblings; one of them was a twin born 26 hours after Bao Bao, but was stillborn, and the other one was born in 2012, but died six days later.

In 2013, a record number of giant panda cubs were born in zoos around the world. In addition to Bao Bao, other giant panda cubs born in 2013 include Yuan Zai in Taiwan, twin cubs Mei Lun and Mei Huan at Zoo Atlanta, Fu Bao at Zoo Vienna, and Xing Bao at Zoo Madrid.

=== National Zoo ===
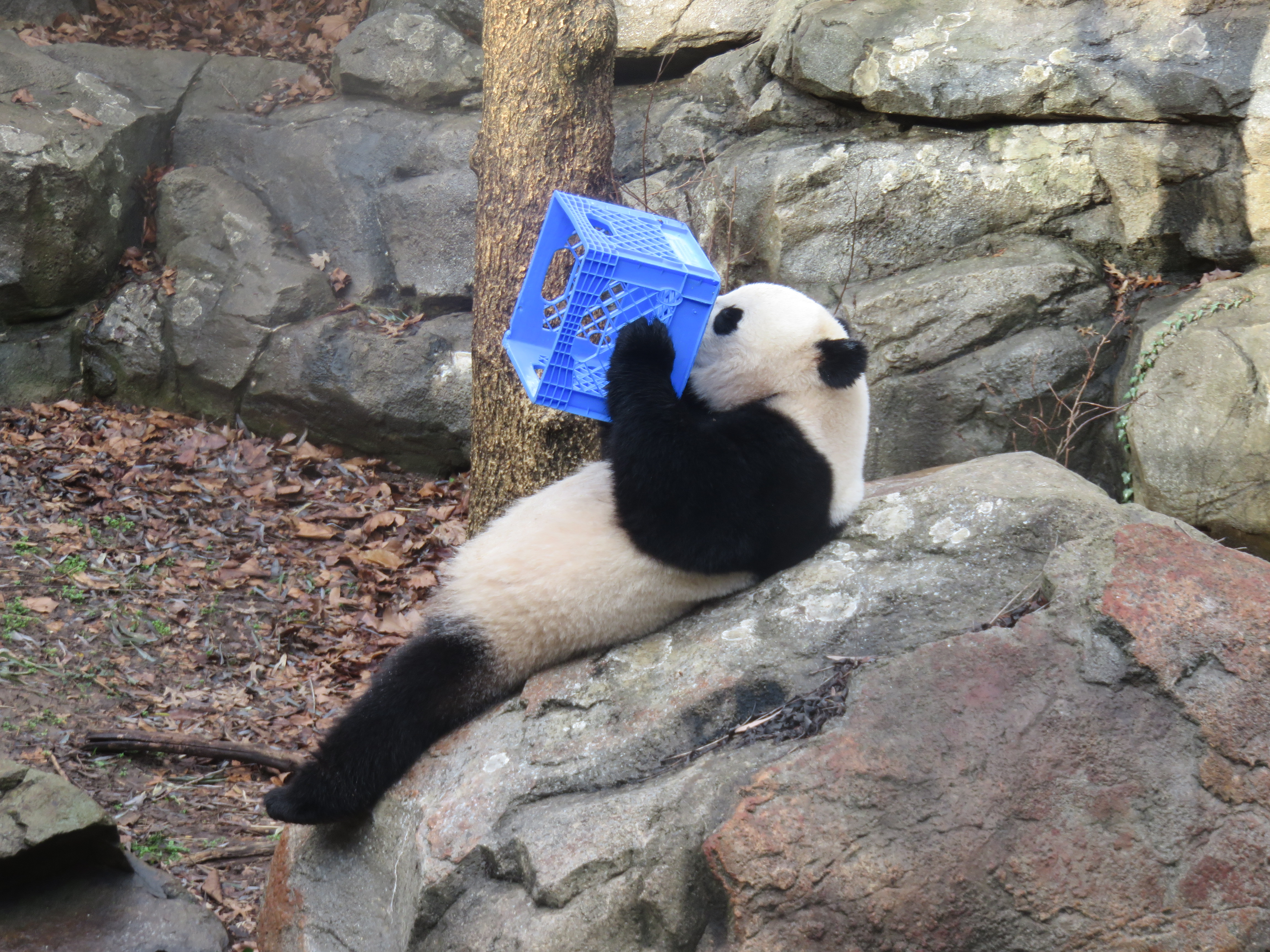
Bao Bao at the National Zoo in January 2016

Bao Bao was named 100 days after her birth. Her name was chosen by voters through the Smithsonian's website. Five names were submitted by Chinese Ambassador Cui Tiankai, U.S. Ambassador Gary Locke, National Zoo panda keepers and its affiliate, Friends of the National Zoo, and the Wolong National Nature Reserve. The five choices for names were Bao Bao, Ling Hua, Long Yun, Mulan, and Zhen Bao. Michelle Obama, First Lady of the United States, and Peng Liyuan, First Lady of China, each sent video messages that were played during the naming ceremony.

Bao Bao made her public debut at the National Zoo on January 18, 2014. She celebrated her first birthday on August 23, 2014, with a giant birthday cake made of frozen fruits and sweet potatoes. Crowds of visitors gathered at the National Zoo to celebrate her birthday. On December 23, 2014, Bao Bao climbed a tree after touching a hot wire used by the National Zoo for animal containment. The zoo reassured the public that this reaction was natural and that Bao Bao was safe in the tree.

=== China ===
Bao Bao remained at the National Zoo until February 21, 2017, when she was sent to the Chengdu Research Base of Giant Panda Breeding in China due to a breeding agreement between the China Wildlife Conservation Association and the National Zoo. She was supposed to be returned before she turned four years old, which is the minimum age at which giant pandas are able to breed. Since 2021, she has been located at the Wolong National Nature Reserve. Bao Bao gave birth to a female cub named Dun Dun on July 29, 2020, as well as twin male cubs Bao Yuan, whose father is Wu Yang; (Note: Chinese: 武阳; pinyin: Wǔ yáng) and Bao Li on August 4, 2021.

== See also ==
- List of individual giant pandas
- List of individual bears
