= Yongning Subdistrict, Nanjing =

Yongning Subdistrict 永宁街道
- Subdistrict
- Location in Jiangsu
- Coordinates: 32°8′7″N 118°34′0″E
- Country: People's Republic of China
- Province: Jiangsu
- Prefecture-level city: Nanjing
- District: Pukou District
- Time zone: UTC+8 (China Standard)

Yongning Subdistrict (simplified Chinese: 永宁街道; traditional Chinese: 永寧街道; pinyin: Yǒngníng Jiēdào) is a subdistrict in Pukou District, Nanjing, Jiangsu, China. As of 2018, it has 8 residential communities and 3 villages under its administration.

== See also ==
- List of township-level divisions of Jiangsu
