= Roewe i6 =

Overview
- Manufacturer: Roewe (SAIC Motor)
- Production: 2017–present

Body and chassis
- Class: Compact sedan (C)
- Body style: 4-door sedan

The Roewe i6 (荣威i6) is a compact sedan produced by SAIC Motor under the Roewe brand succeeding the Roewe 550.

== First generation (2017–2025) ==
First generation
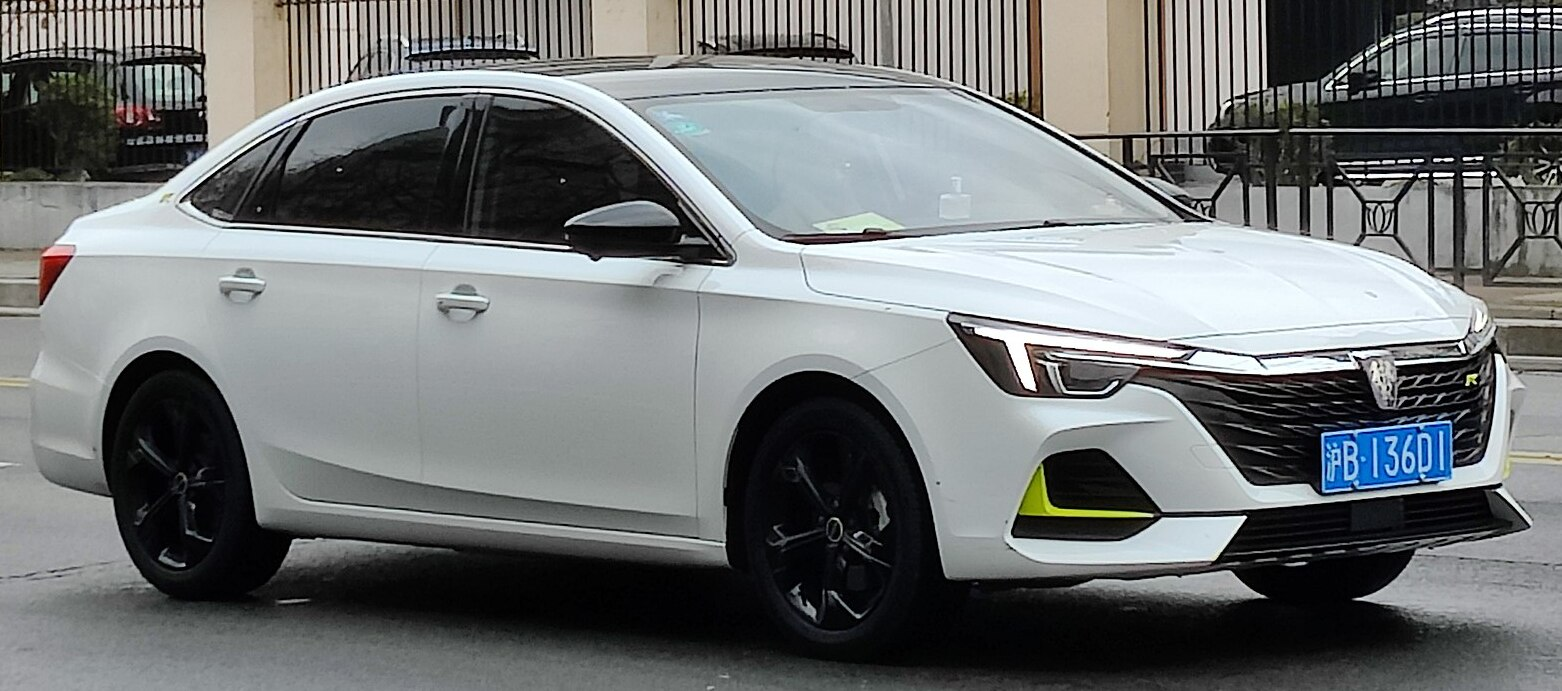
- Roewe i6 Max

Overview
- Model code: IP31; IP34 (ei6)
- Also called: Roewe i6 Max (facelift); Rising ER6
- Production: 2017–2025
- Assembly: China: Nanjing (SAIC Motor's Nanjing Pukou Plant)
- Designer: Shao Jingfeng

Body and chassis
- Class: Compact car (C)
- Body style: 4-door sedan
- Layout: Front-engine, front-wheel-drive
- Related: MG6 (II)

Powertrain
- Engine: 1.0L GM/SAIC SGE I3 (turbo petrol) (16T); 1.5L 15E4E Turbo I4 (petrol) (20T); 1.0L GM/SAIC SGE Turbo I3 + SAIC EDU (ei6); 1.5 L GM/SAIC SGE + SAIC EDU turbo I4 (ei6 MAX)
- Electric motor: Synchronous Permanent Magnetic Motor (PHEV); 135 Kw Huayu Auto TZ204XS1152 Permanent magnet synchronous motor (EV)
- Transmission: 6-speed manual; 7-speed DCT; 2-speed electric transmission; 10-speed EDU intelligent electric drive variable speed and iEM intelligent energy management system (6-speed engine and 4-speed electric motor)
- Hybrid drivetrain: Plug-in Hybrid (ei6 / ei6 MAX)
- Battery: 9.1 kWh Lithium-ion (ei6 MAX); 69.9 kWh Lithium-ion (ER6)

Dimensions
- Wheelbase: 2,715 mm (106.9 in)
- Length: 4,671 mm (183.9 in); 4,722 mm (185.9 in) (i6 Max)
- Width: 1,835 mm (72.2 in)
- Height: 1,464 mm (57.6 in); 1,493 mm (58.8 in) (i6 Max)

Chronology
- Predecessor: Roewe 550/e550
- Successor: Roewe i6 (Second generation; ICE); Roewe D6 (ei6)

The first generation Roewe i6 was previewed by the Roewe Vision-R concept, that debuted during the 2015 Guangzhou Auto Show. The Roewe ei6 is the hybrid version of the i6.

=== Roewe i6 (Gasoline powered model) ===
The Roewe i6, codename IP31, was launched on the 2016 Guangzhou Auto Show in China, as Roewe's new C segment sedan, replacing the aging Roewe 550, and sharing the platform with the second generation MG 6 sedan. It is the first sedan model using the all new "Lv Dong" design philosophy, which means the fusion of oriental aesthetic culture and western design discipline.

The i6 is available with two engines: a 1.0 litre three cylinder producing 125 hp (93 kW; 127 PS), and the 1.5 litre turbo with 170 hp (130 kW; 170 PS).

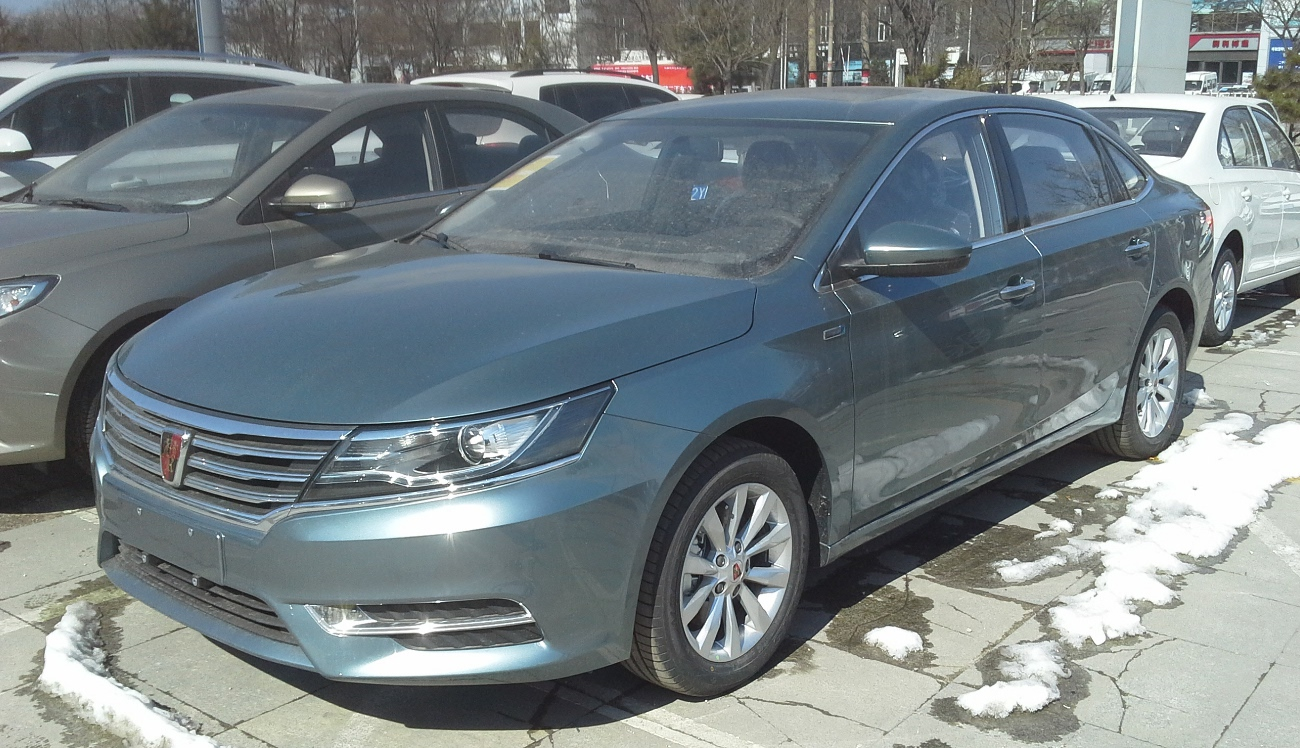
Roewe i6 (front)

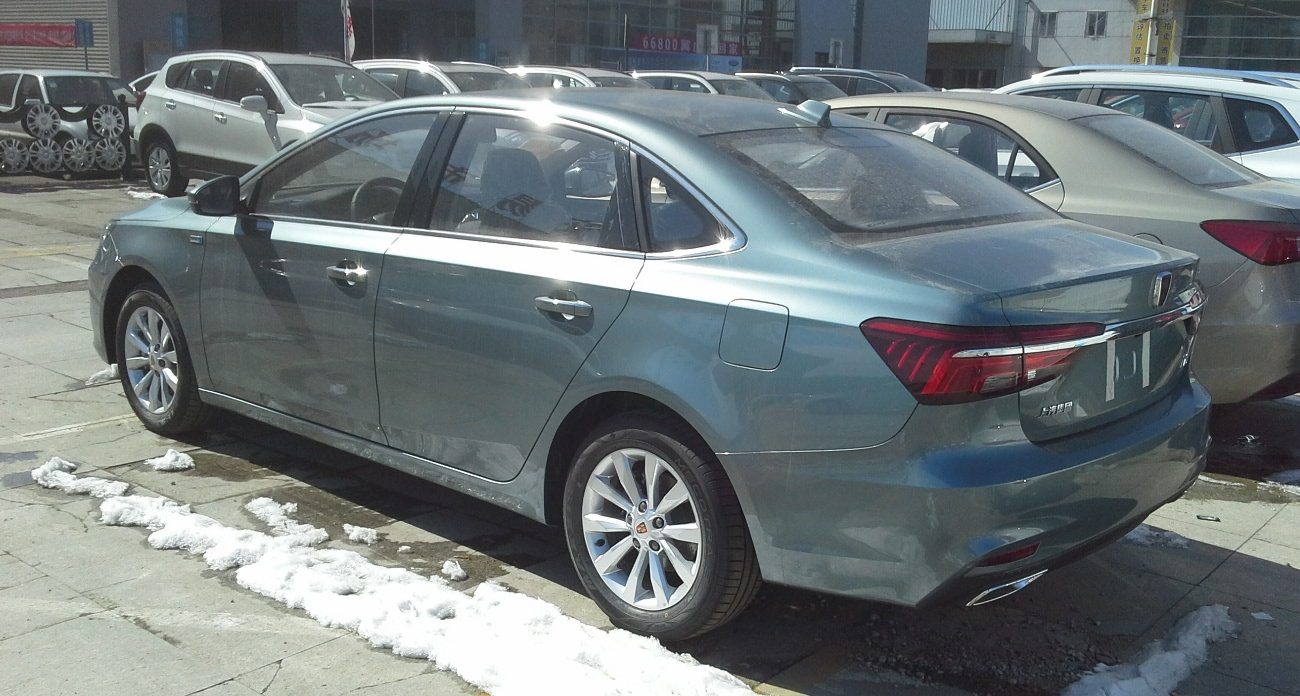
Roewe i6 (rear)

=== Roewe ei6 (PHEV) ===
The Roewe ei6, codename IP34, is the plug-in hybrid variant of the Roewe i6, and was also launched on the 2016 Guangzhou Auto Show in China. Same as the Roewe RX5 and eRX5, the main styling difference would be the grilles. The petrol version i6 would have a slightly smaller grille, while the hybrid ei6 would have a relatively larger one. The ei6 has 228 hp (170 kW; 231 PS) in total, using the 1.0 with an extra 82 hp (61 kW; 83 PS) electric motor.

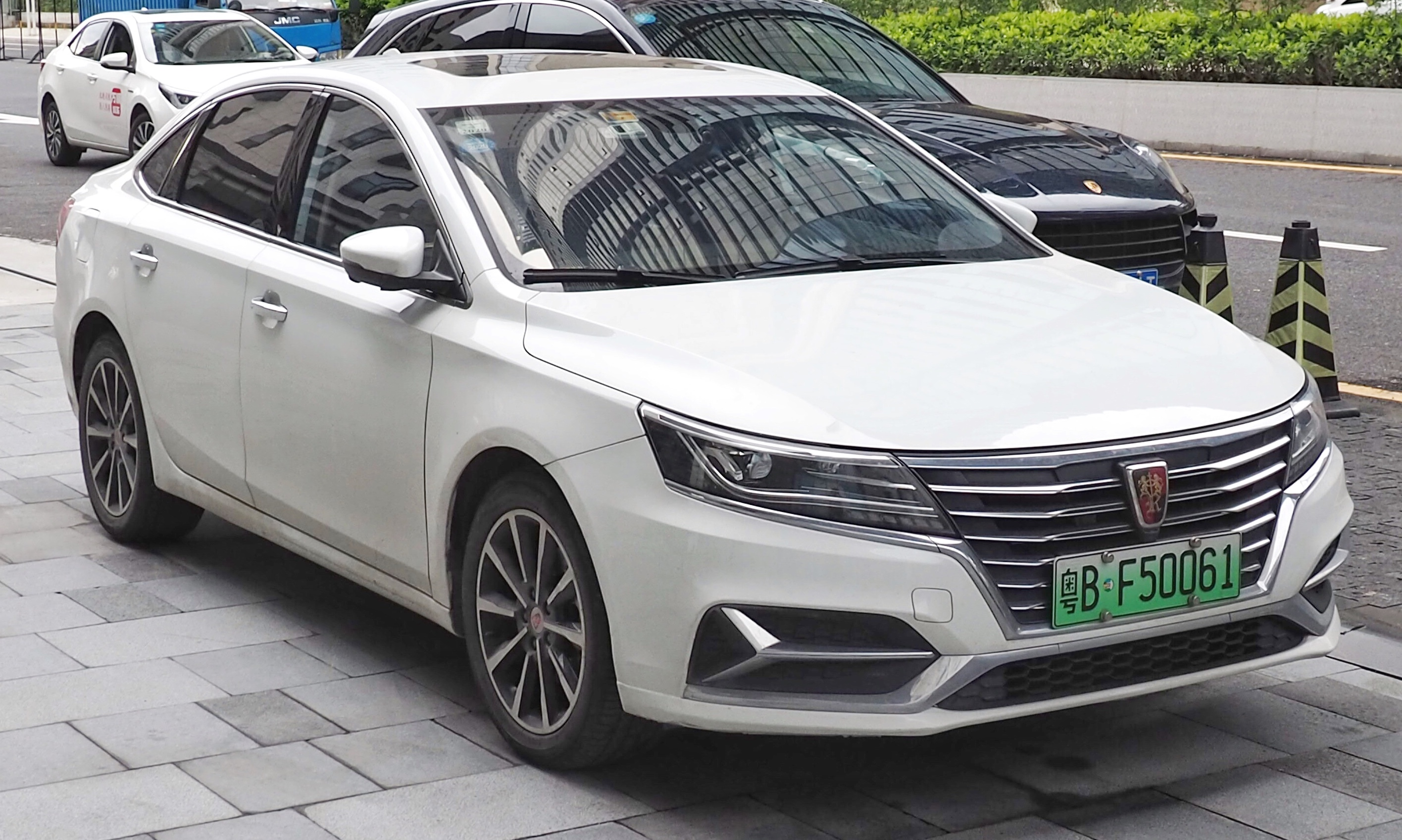
Roewe ei6

=== Roewe i6 Max/ei6 Max ===
The Roewe i6 Max and Roewe ei6 Max are larger more premium versions of the i6 series products launched in 2020. The Roewe i6 MAX is 45 mm (1.8 in) longer and 29 mm (1.1 in) taller. It features a new family-style front fascia design elements and is adopted With the Ronglin wing grille, the updated design creates a stronger sense of design within the updated Roewe product line. The facelifted headlights are integrated with the grilles, which further enhances the front face visual width.

The Roewe i6 MAX is equipped with the 1.5 liter second-generation Blue Core 300TGI mid-cylinder direct-injection turbocharged engine by SAIC which meets the National VI emission standards. The engine produces a maximum power of 131 kW (178 PS; 176 hp) and a maximum torque of 275 N⋅m (203 lb⋅ft). The 7-speed automatic gearbox uses the world's first three-chamber independent lubrication technology.

The hybrid Roewe ei6 MAX is equipped with a 1.5 liter second-generation blue core 300TGI in-cylinder central direct injection turbocharged engine plus a 100 kW high-power motor and a 10-speed second-generation EDU intelligent electric drive transmission, the maximum torque is 480 N⋅m (350 lb⋅ft), and the battery has a 70 km (43 mi) pure electric driving range. Fuel consumption is 1.1 L/100 km (260 mpg_{‑imp}; 210 mpg_{‑US}).

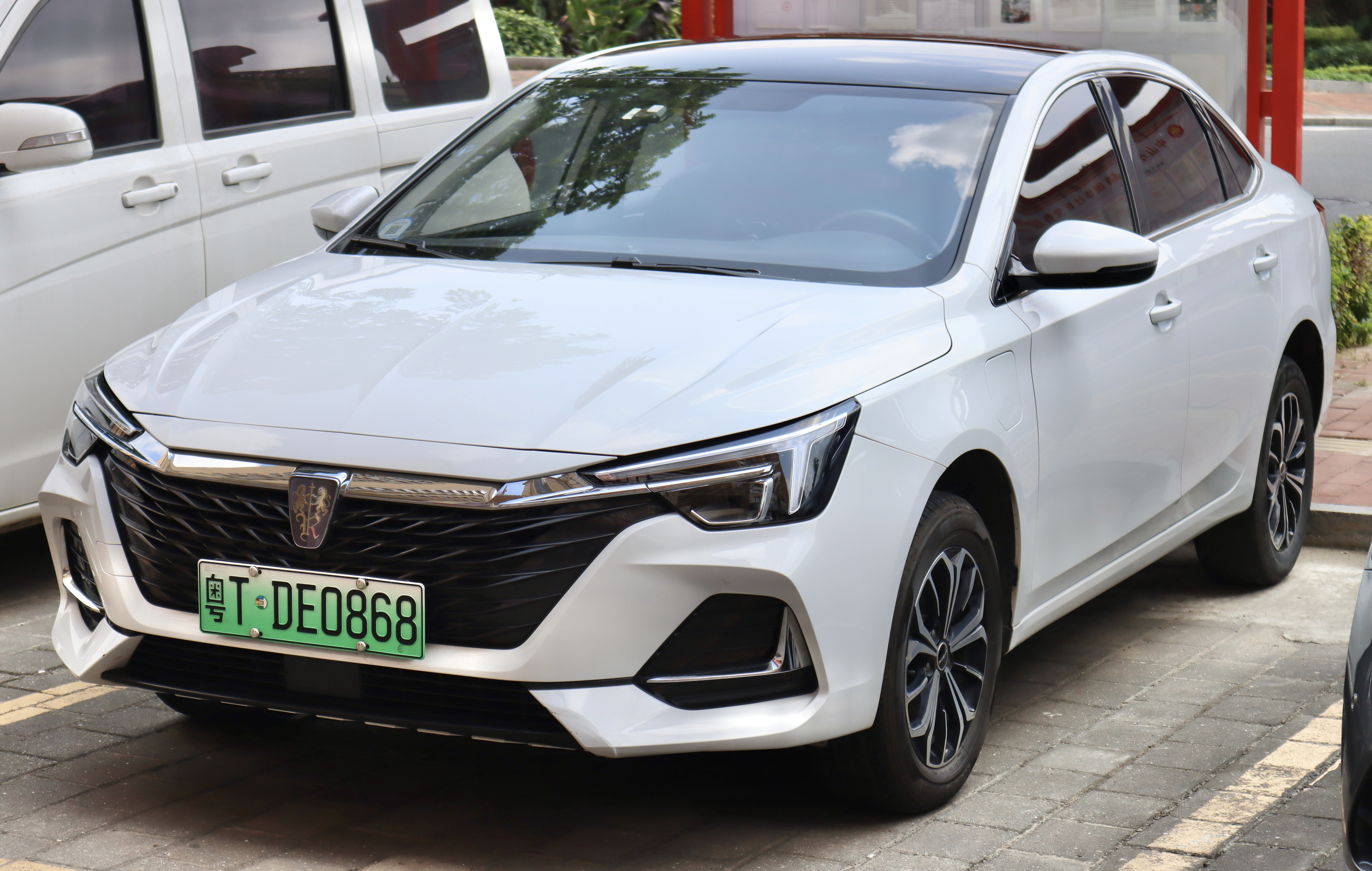
Roewe ei6 Max (front)

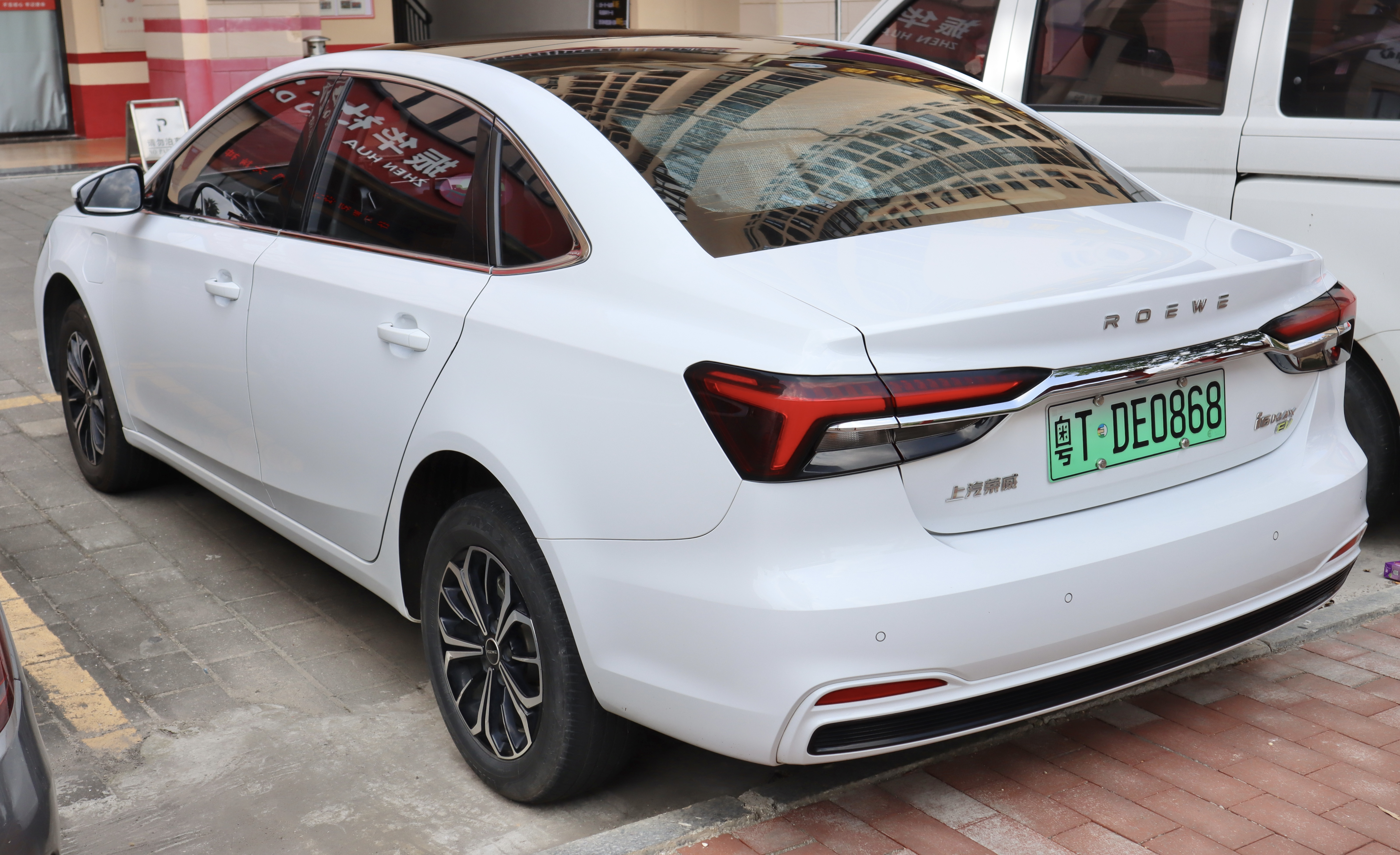
Roewe ei6 Max (rear)

=== Rising ER6 ===
The ER6 is the first pure electric sedan from the Roewe brand with the newly introduced “R” emblem based on the i6. The Rising ER6 was officially launched in Shanghai by SAIC in August 2020, it is offered in a total of three different trim levels with the official price ranging from 162,800 yuan to 200,800 yuan (~US$23,443 – 28,915) after subsidies.

Since the ER6 is based on the existing Roewe i6, the dimensions are similar, with the exact same width and wheelbase, the redesigned front and rear end styling led to a new length and height of 4,724 mm (186.0 in) and 1,493 mm (58.8 in) respectively.

The Rising ER6 is powered by an electric motor, TZ204XS1152 produced by Huayu Automotive Electric System Co., Ltd., producing 184 PS (135 kW; 181 hp). The ER6 is equipped with a ternary lithium-ion battery pack and the energy consumption under NEDC operating conditions is 12.2 kWh/100km, with the NEDC cruising range reaching up to 620 kilometres (385 mi).

As of October 2021, SAIC announced Feifan (非凡) as the Chinese name of the “R” brand with the full name being Feifan Automobile Technology Co., Ltd. and separate the R brand products of SAIC to Feifan automobile. The R brand was originally set as a premium EV brand and was technically under Roewe, and the English name was officially called Rising Auto as of 2022. Starting from the announcement of the Rising Auto and Feifan Automobile name, the original R brand has become an independent company. The cars will still have the R brand logo. On 30 October, Rising Auto became an independent company parallel to IM Motors (another EV subbrand of SAIC).

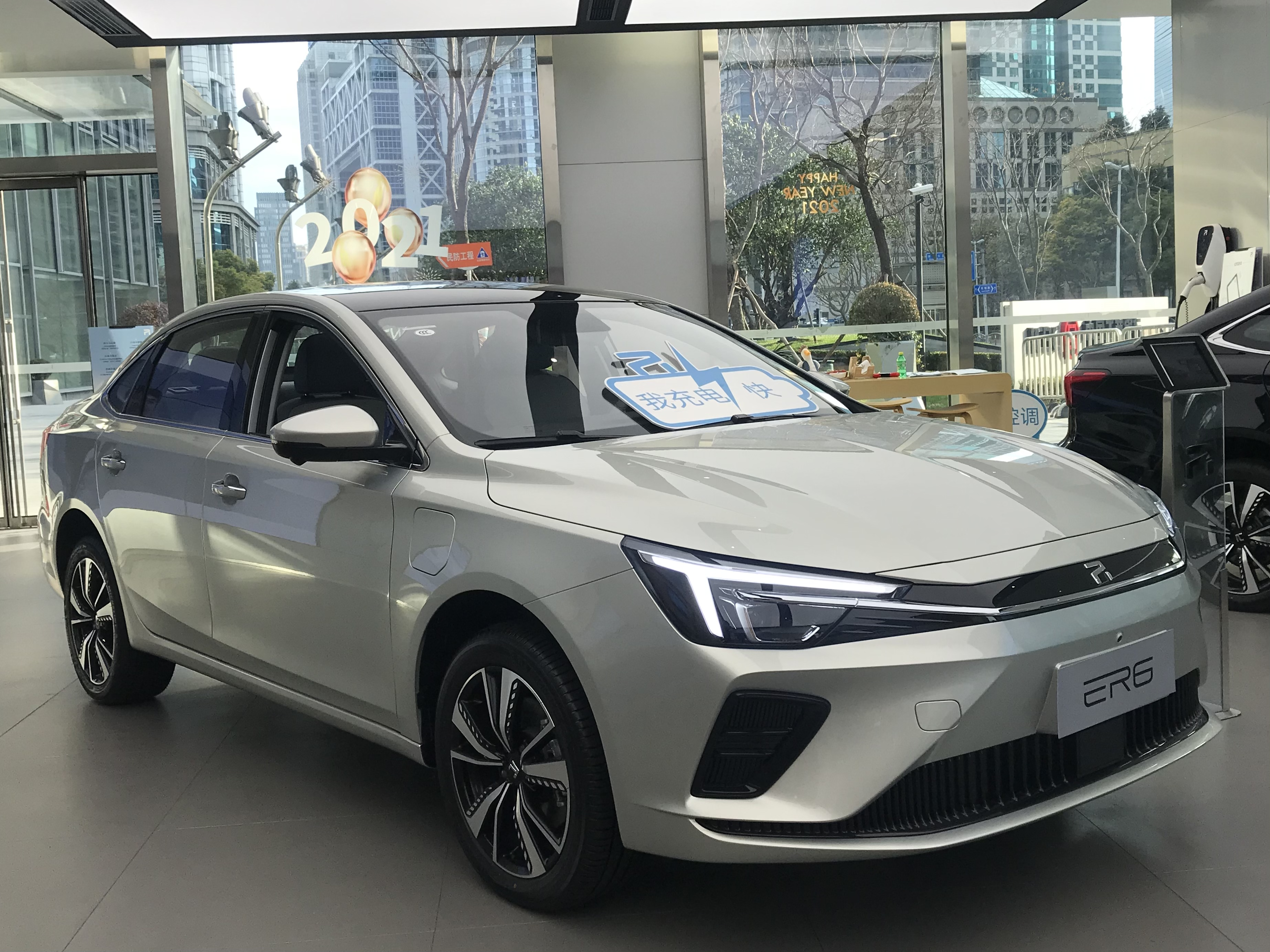
Rising ER6 (front)

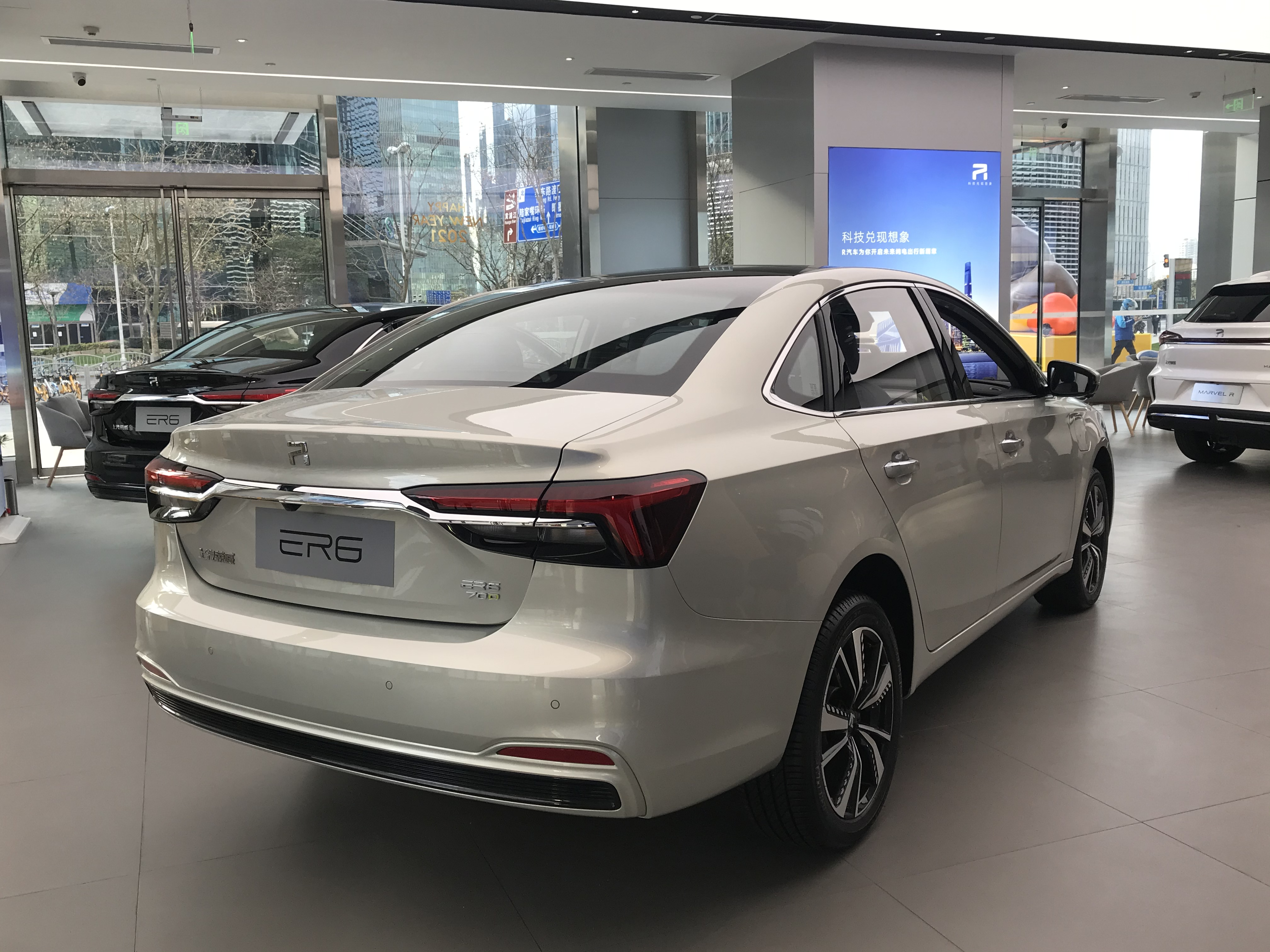
Rising ER6 (rear)

== Second generation (2026–present) ==
Second generation
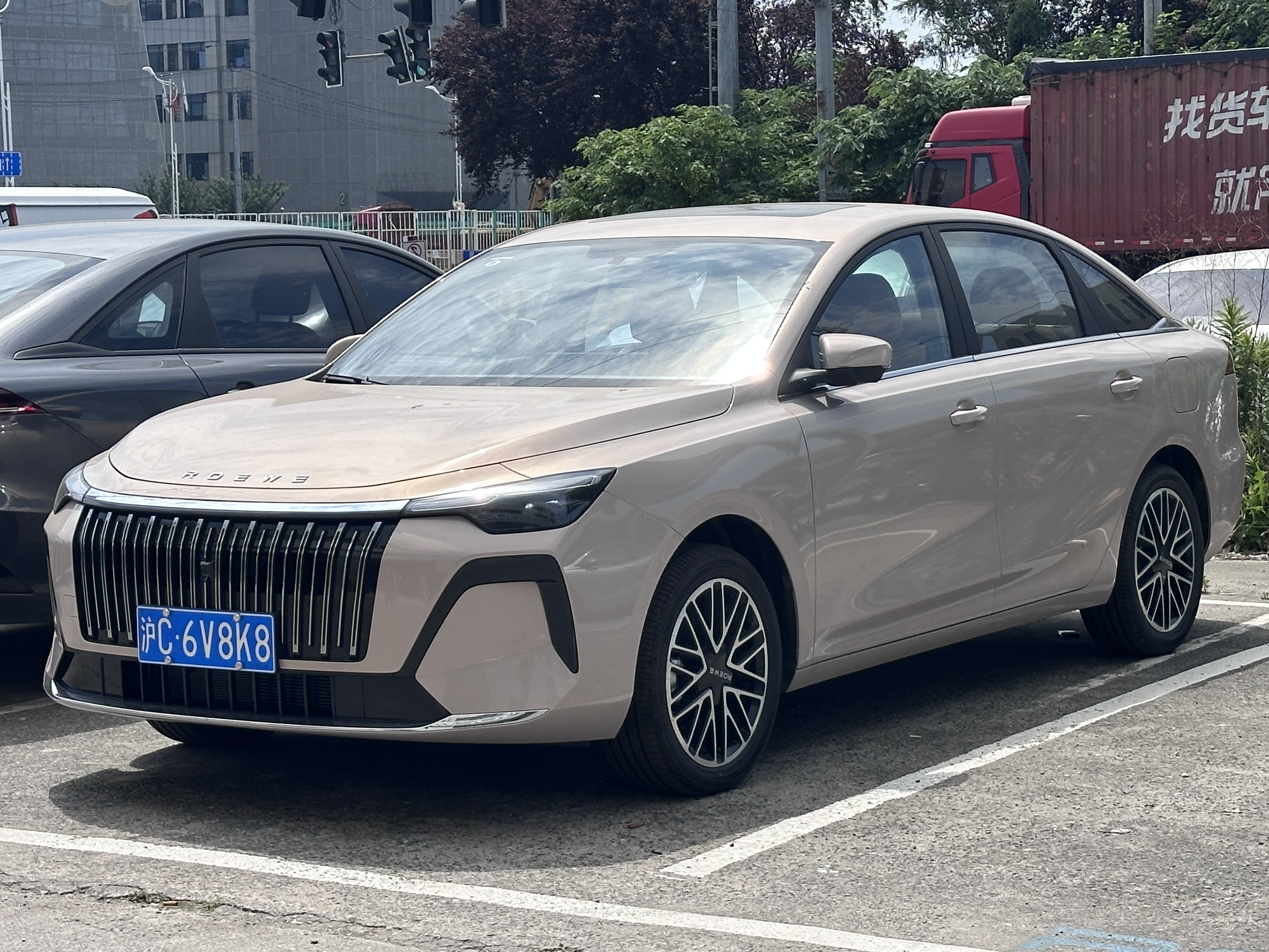

Overview
- Production: 2026–present
- Assembly: China: Nanjing (SAIC Motor's Nanjing Pukou Plant)

Body and chassis
- Class: Compact car (C)
- Body style: 4-door sedan
- Layout: Front-engine, front-wheel-drive
- Related: Roewe D6

Powertrain
- Engine: 1.5L 15FCD I4 (petrol)

Dimensions
- Wheelbase: 2,755 mm (108.5 in)
- Length: 4,767 mm (187.7 in)
- Width: 1,828 mm (72.0 in)
- Height: 1,498 mm (59.0 in)

Chronology
- Predecessor: Roewe i6 (First generation)

The second-generation i6 was introduced in March 2026 as the successor to the original Roewe i6, which had been on sale since 2017. Unlike the first-generation model, the second-generation i6 is positioned as a conventional petrol-powered family sedan and forms part of Roewe’s broader strategy of offering related petrol and electric vehicles within the same product family.

The second-generation i6 is heavily based on the Roewe D6, a battery-electric compact sedan introduced by Roewe in 2025. The two models are closely related in their underlying body structure, exterior proportions, wheelbase, and cabin architecture. While the D6 uses a fully electric front-wheel-drive powertrain, the i6 adapts the same basic vehicle concept for internal-combustion power. This shared basis allows Roewe to develop petrol and electric sedans from a common family of vehicles, potentially reducing engineering and production costs.

The Roewe D6, on which the new i6 is based, is a four-door, five-seat compact sedan measuring 4,792 mm long, 1,828 mm wide, and 1,496 mm high, with a 2,750 mm wheelbase. It is offered with front-wheel drive and a single electric motor, with either a 42.8 kWh battery and 450 km of CLTC range or a 54.0 kWh battery and 520 km of CLTC range. These proportions and the sedan body format provide the foundation from which the second-generation i6 was developed.

The second-generation i6 adopts Roewe’s contemporary design language, with a wide front fascia, slim lighting elements, a low and streamlined roofline, and a clean sedan silhouette. Its interior is expected to follow the minimalist approach used across newer Roewe models, incorporating a large central touchscreen, digital instrumentation, and connected-car functions. The model is aimed primarily at the Chinese domestic market, where it competes with mainstream petrol-powered compact sedans such as the BYD Qin, Geely Emgrand, and Changan Eado.

The use of the D6 as the basis for the second-generation i6 represents a major departure from the original i6 rather than a conventional facelift. The new model combines the D6’s modern body structure and interior concept with the conventional petrol powertrain format traditionally associated with the i6 nameplate, creating a mechanically related petrol counterpart to Roewe’s electric D6.

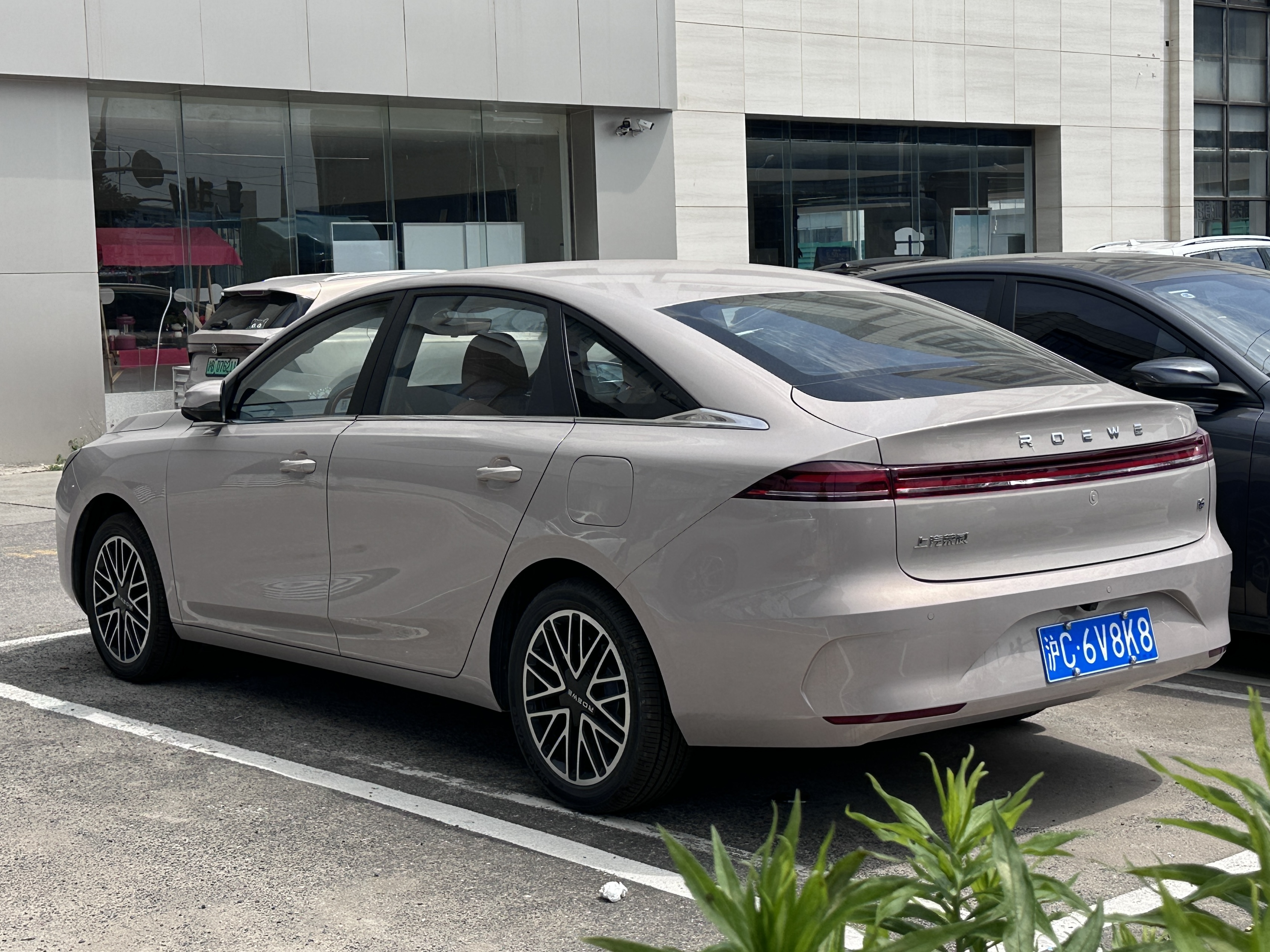
Rear view

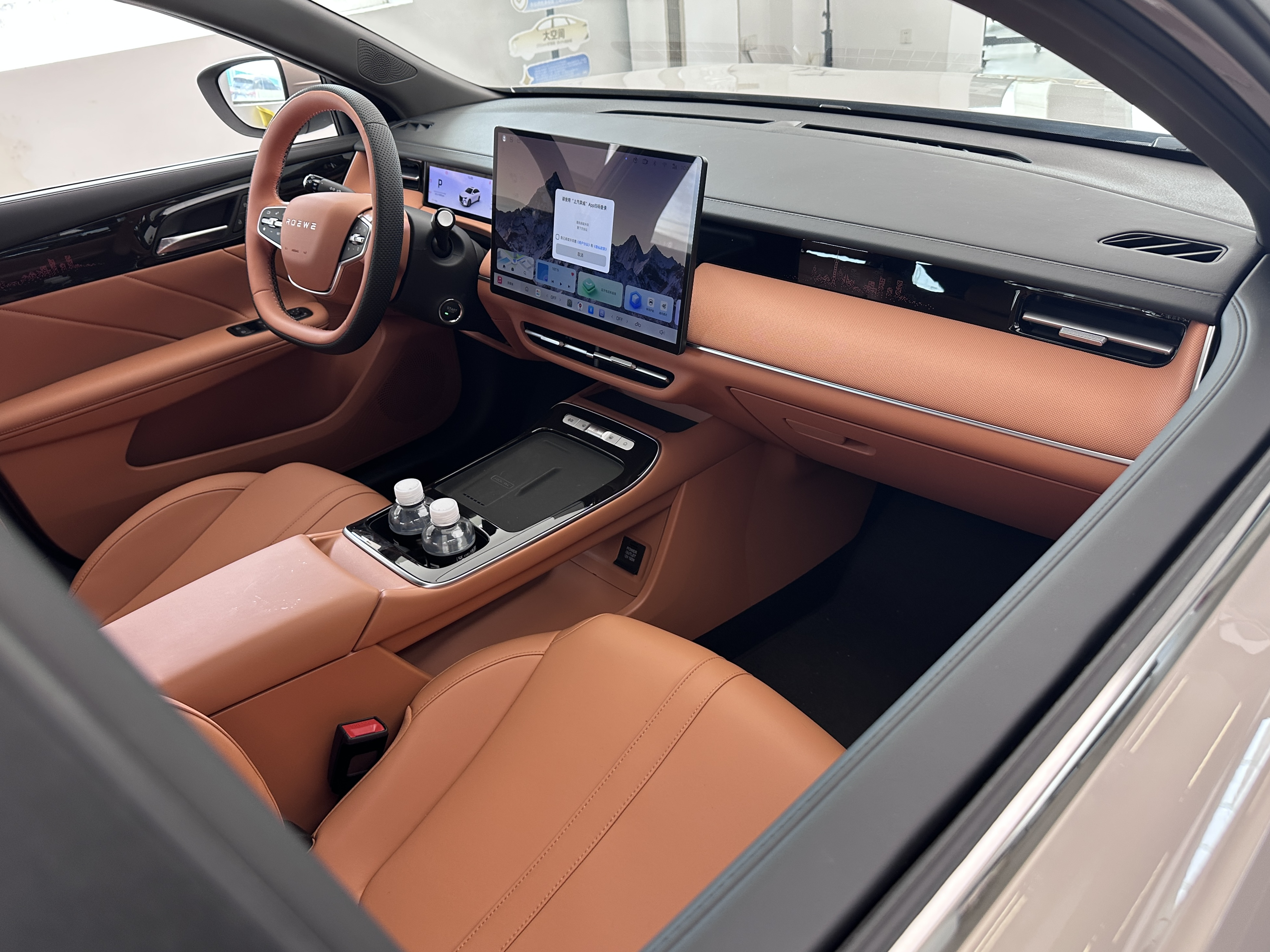
Interior

== Sales ==
Year	China		
Year	i6	EV	Rising ER6
2023	1,688	11,575	657
2024	5	8,967	20
2025	121	5,025	—
