= Taishan Subdistrict, Xuzhou =

Taishan Subdistrict 泰山街道
- Subdistrict
- Location in Jiangsu
- Coordinates: 34°13′27″N 117°11′2″E
- Country: People's Republic of China
- Province: Jiangsu
- Prefecture-level city: Xuzhou
- District: Quanshan District
- Time zone: UTC+8 (China Standard)

Taishan Subdistrict (Chinese: 泰山街道; pinyin: Tàishān Jiēdào) is a subdistrict in Quanshan District, Xuzhou, Jiangsu, China. As of 2018, it has 9 residential communities under its administration.

== See also ==
- List of township-level divisions of Jiangsu
