= Taishan Township, Gansu =

Taishan Township 泰山乡
- Township
- Location in Gansu
- Coordinates: 33°46′24″N 106°26′57″E
- Country: People's Republic of China
- Province: Gansu
- Prefecture-level city: Longnan
- County: Liangdang
- Village-level divisions: 8 villages
- Elevation: 1,098 m (3,602 ft)
- Time zone: UTC+8 (China Standard)
- Area code: 0939

Taishan (Chinese: 泰山; pinyin: Tàishān) is a township of Liangdang County in the Qin Mountains of southeastern Gansu province, China, located around 2.1 kilometres (1.3 mi) west of the border with Shaanxi and 20 km (12 mi) southeast of the county seat. As of 2018, it has eight villages under its administration.

== See also ==
- List of township-level divisions of Gansu
