= Taishang, Jilin =

Taishang 台上镇
- Town
- Location in Jilin
- Coordinates: 41°17′47″N 125°50′27″E
- Country: People's Republic of China
- Province: Jilin
- Prefecture-level city: Tonghua
- County-level city: Ji'an
- Time zone: UTC+8 (China Standard)

Taishang (Chinese: 台上; pinyin: Táishàng) is a town of Ji'an, Jilin, China. As of 2018, it has two residential communities and 12 villages under its administration.
