= Bao Li and Qing Bao =

Giant pandas residing at the National Zoo

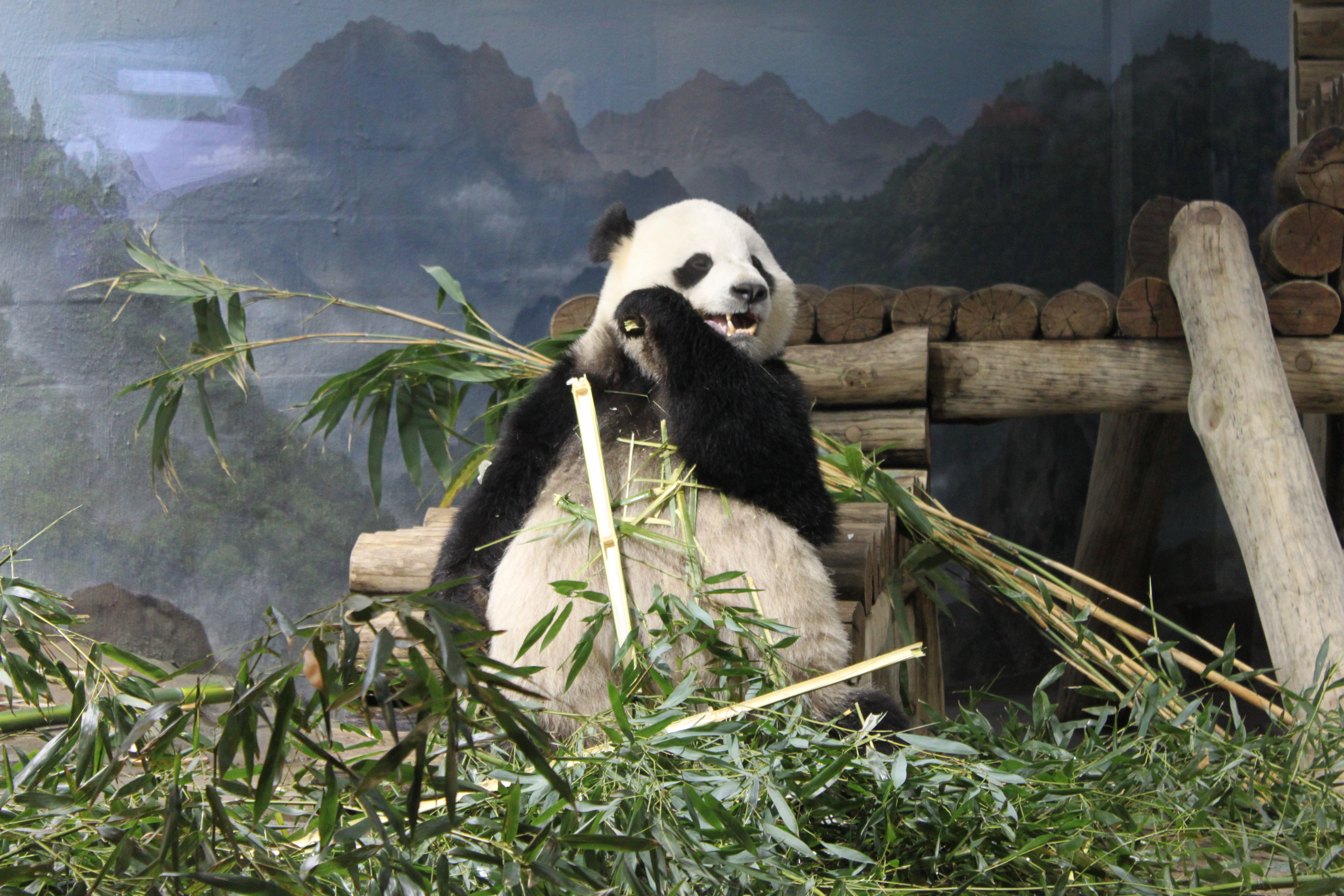
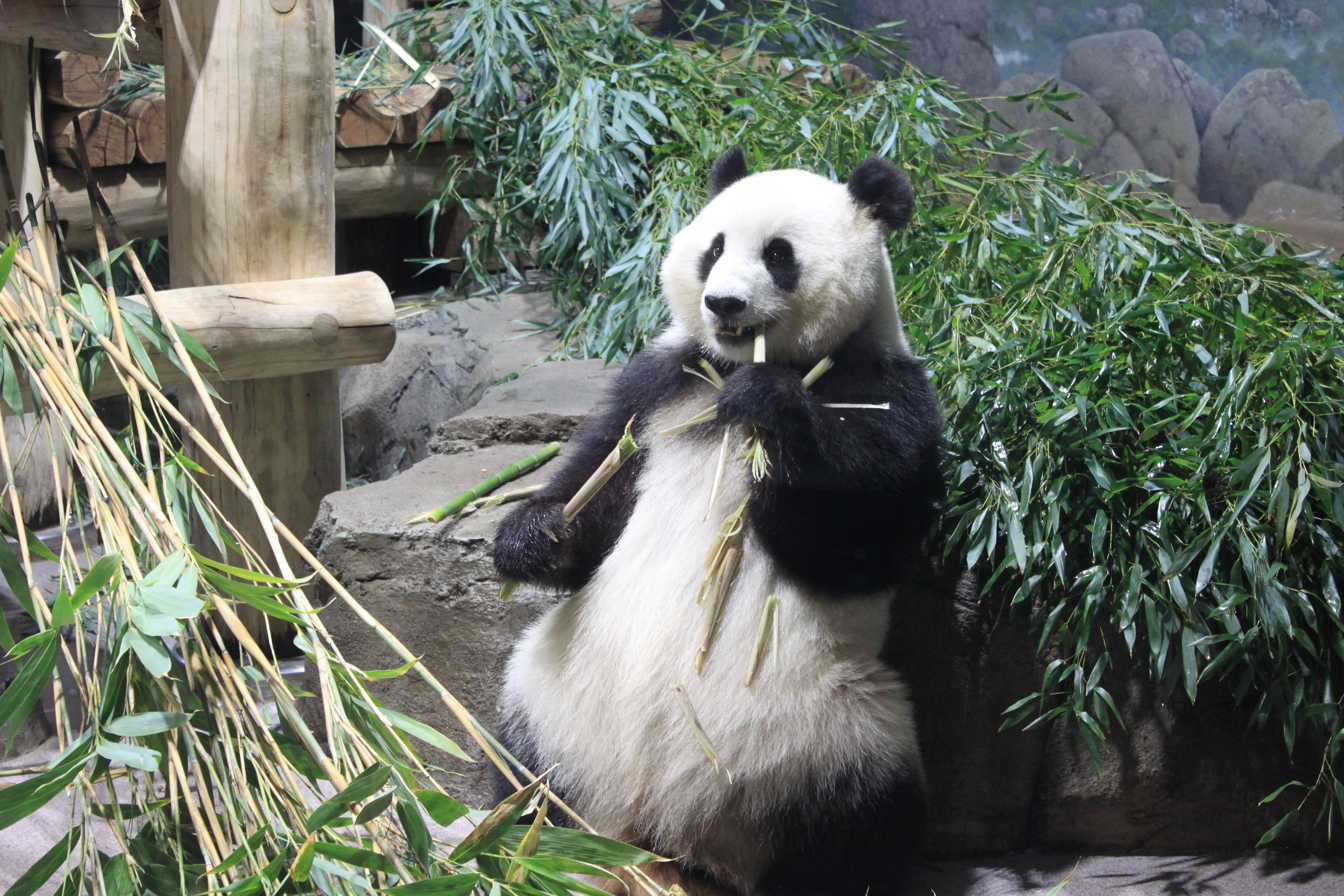
- Bao Li, the panda, at the Smithsonian National Zoo in 2026 Qing Bao at the Smithsonian National Zoo in 2026
- Species: Giant panda
- Born: Chengdu Research Base of Giant Panda Breeding, Chengdu, Sichuan, China
- Residence: National Zoological Park, Washington, D.C.
- Bao Li
- Sex: Male
- Born: August 4, 2021 (age 5)
- Parents: Bao Bao (mother); Wu Yang (father)
- Qing Bao
- Sex: Female
- Born: September 12, 2021 (age 5)
- Parents: Jia Mei and Qing Qing

Bao Li (simplified Chinese: 宝力; traditional Chinese: 寶力; pinyin: Bǎo Lì; born August 4, 2021) and Qing Bao (simplified Chinese: 青宝; traditional Chinese: 青寶; pinyin: Qīng Bǎo; born September 12, 2021) are two giant pandas who are currently residing at the National Zoo in Washington, D.C. The two giant pandas arrived at the National Zoo on October 15, 2024, and are expected to leave in April 2034, as part of an agreement between the China Wildlife Conservation Association and the National Zoo.

Bao Li and Qing Bao were able to be viewed by National Zoo members before their public debut on January 24, 2025. The two giant pandas' habitats are separated by a fenceline with mesh screens, which they have begun to flirt through.

== Life ==
Qing Bao was born at the Chengdu Research Base of Giant Panda Breeding in Sichuan, China, on September 12, 2021. Qing Bao is the cub of Jia Mei and Qing Qing. Bao Li was born at the Chengdu Research Base on August 4, 2021. Bao Li is the cub of Bao Bao, who was born at the National Zoo in Washington, D.C. He is the twin brother of Bao Yuan and the sibling of Dun Dun. Bao Li and Qing Bao are the current giant pandas in residence at the National Zoo.

Under the terms of the agreement with the China Wildlife Conservation Association (CWCA), the two pandas will be leased to the National Zoo from October 2024 to April 2034, for an annual fee of US$1 million. In addition, any new cubs born to Bao Li and Qing Bao would ultimately have to be shipped to the Chengdu Research Base before they reach the age of 4.

On October 15, 2024, Bao Li and Qing Bao arrived in the U.S. at Dulles International Airport on a FedEx flight specifically made for giant pandas, and they were subsequently transported to the National Zoo. Their arrival from China was announced five months prior. From January 10–19, 2025, Bao Li and Qing Bao were debuted during a preview, where they were available to be viewed ahead of their official public debut by members of the National Zoo.

The two pandas were received with much excitement at their public debut on January 24, 2025, where they were welcomed by D.C. Mayor Muriel Bowser, local kindergarteners, and a funk band. Additionally, the National Zoo's Giant Panda Cam, a live webcam of the panda exhibit, was relaunched on the day of the pandas' debut, allowing people around the world to view Bao Li and Qing Bao. Bao Li and Qing Bao have been given their own habitats at the National Zoo. Due to giant pandas being solitary creatures, the habitats are separated via a fenceline with mesh screens that the Smithsonian called "howdy" windows. In April 2026, the two pandas began to flirt through the "howdy" windows. As of August 2026 and September 2026, respectively, Bao Li and Qing Bao are still living at the National Zoo.

== See also ==
- List of individual giant pandas
