= Pukou, Nanjing =

Pukou 浦口区 Pukow
- District
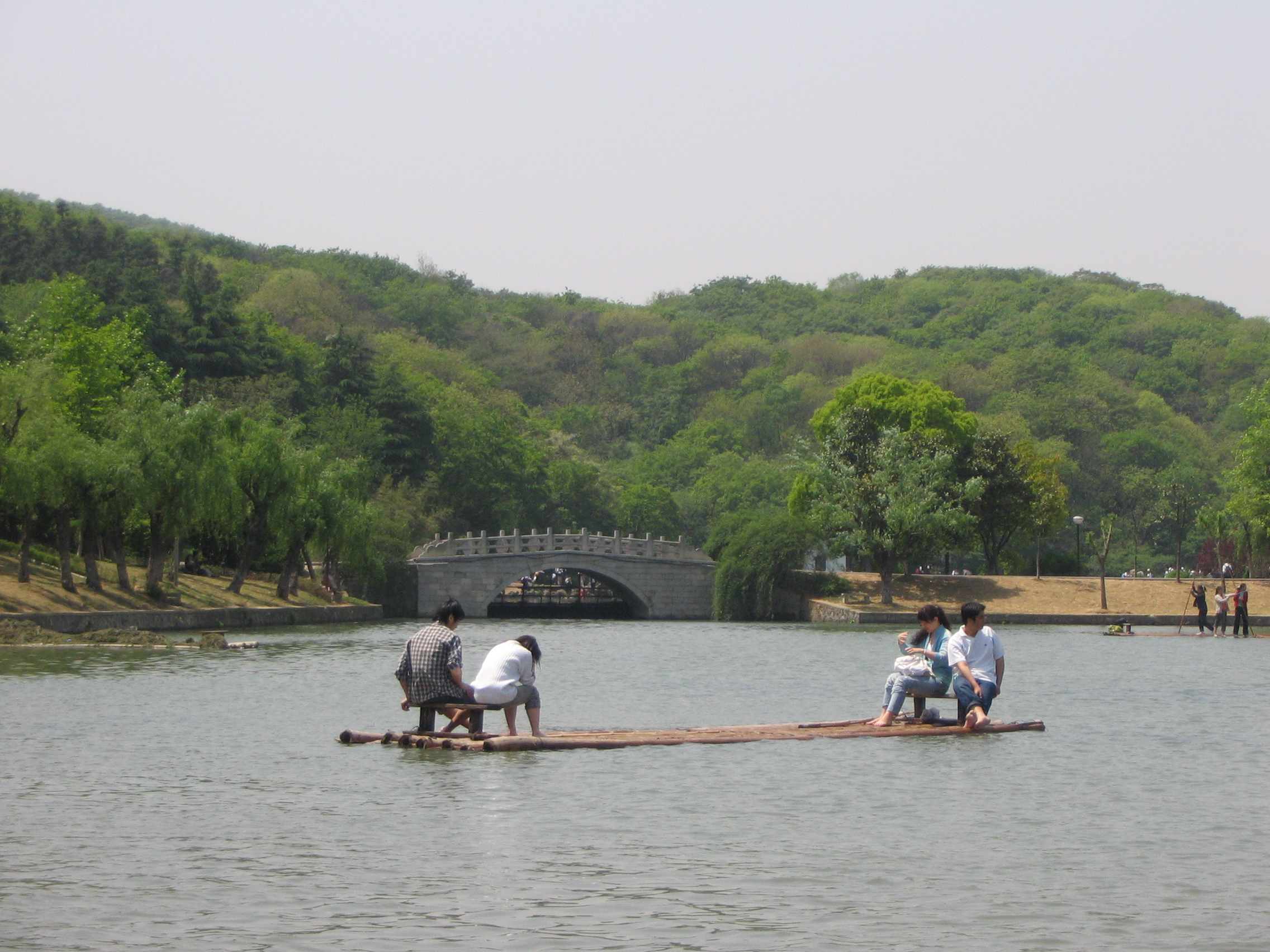
- Bamboo raft in Nanjing Pearl Spring Tourist & Holiday Resort, in Pukou District

- Location in Jiangsu
- Coordinates: 32°04′00″N 118°37′40″E
- Country: People's Republic of China
- Province: Jiangsu
- Sub-provincial city: Nanjing

Area
  - Total: 913.75 km^{2} (352.80 sq mi)

Population (2017)
  - Total: 769,900
  - Density: 842.6/km^{2} (2,182/sq mi)
- Time zone: UTC+8 (China Standard)
- Postal code: 211800
Nanjing district map
Subdivisions of Nanjing, Jiangsu
City Proper
1	Xuanwu
2	Qinhuai
3	Jianye
4	Gulou
5	Yuhuatai
6	Qixia
Suburban
7	Jiangning
8	Pukou
9	Luhe
Rural
10	Lishui
11	Gaochun

Pukou
- Traditional Chinese: 浦口
- Simplified Chinese: 浦口
- Postal: Pukow
Transcriptions
Standard Mandarin
- Hanyu Pinyin: Pǔkǒu
- Bopomofo: ㄆㄨˇ ㄎㄡˇ
- Wade–Giles: P'u^{3}-k'ou^{3}
- IPA: [pʰù.kʰòʊ]

Pukou District (simplified Chinese: 浦口区; traditional Chinese: 浦口區; pinyin: Pǔkǒu Qū) is one of 11 districts of Nanjing, the capital of Jiangsu province, China, lying northwest across the Yangtze River from downtown Nanjing.

The district was formerly the southern terminus of the Tianjin-Pukou Railway; railcars had to be ferried across the river until it was bridged in 1968.

== Administrative subdivisions ==
Pukou has administrative jurisdiction to 9 subdistricts:

Name	Chinese (S)	Hanyu Pinyin	Population (2010)	Area (km^{2})
Taishan Subdistrict	泰山街道	Tàishān Jiēdào	165,706	45
Dingshan Subdistrict	顶山街道	Dǐngshān Jiēdào	47,082	39.79
Yanjiang Subdistrict	沿江街道	Yánjiāng Jiēdào	66,329	30.9
Jiangpu Subdistrict (Kiangpu)	江浦街道	Jiāngpǔ Jiēdào	164,891	195
Qiaolin Subdistrict	桥林街道	Qiáolín Jiēdào	66,973	184.95
Tangquan Subdistrict	汤泉街道	Tāngquán Jiēdào	26,950	109
Pancheng Subdistrict	盘城街道	Pánchéng Jiēdào	69,815	51.5
Xingdian Subdistrict	星甸街道	Xīngdiān Jiēdào	58,006	141.19
Yongning Subdistrict	永宁街道	Yǒngníng Jiēdào	44,546	115.5

- Defunct - Shiqiao Town (石桥镇) merged with Shiqiao Town (星甸镇) & Wujiang Town (乌江镇) merged into Qiaolin Subdistrict

== Geography ==
Pukou District is located at the northwestern of Nanjing city, between the Yangtze River and Chu River.

It is separated from the main part of the city by the Yangtze River with hundred miles of mountains and forests.

It has an area of 902 square kilometers with a population of 480,000.

=== Climate ===
Pukou District has a humid subtropical climate (Köppen climate classification Cfa). The average annual temperature in Pukou is 15.8 °C (60.4 °F). The average annual rainfall is 1,139.8 mm (44.87 in) with July as the wettest month. The temperatures are highest on average in July, at around 28.0 °C (82.4 °F), and lowest in January, at around 2.6 °C (36.7 °F).

Climate data for Pukou District, elevation 47 m (154 ft), (1991–2020 normals, extremes 1981–present)
Month	Jan	Feb	Mar	Apr	May	Jun	Jul	Aug	Sep	Oct	Nov	Dec	Year
Record high °C (°F)	21.4 (70.5)	27.9 (82.2)	33.2 (91.8)	33.2 (91.8)	35.3 (95.5)	37.0 (98.6)	39.3 (102.7)	39.5 (103.1)	38.1 (100.6)	33.7 (92.7)	28.5 (83.3)	22.4 (72.3)	39.5 (103.1)
Mean daily maximum °C (°F)	7.3 (45.1)	10.0 (50.0)	15.1 (59.2)	21.5 (70.7)	26.6 (79.9)	29.3 (84.7)	32.4 (90.3)	31.9 (89.4)	27.9 (82.2)	22.7 (72.9)	16.4 (61.5)	9.9 (49.8)	20.9 (69.6)
Daily mean °C (°F)	3.0 (37.4)	5.4 (41.7)	10.1 (50.2)	16.2 (61.2)	21.5 (70.7)	25.0 (77.0)	28.2 (82.8)	27.8 (82.0)	23.5 (74.3)	17.8 (64.0)	11.4 (52.5)	5.2 (41.4)	16.3 (61.3)
Mean daily minimum °C (°F)	−0.1 (31.8)	1.9 (35.4)	5.9 (42.6)	11.4 (52.5)	16.9 (62.4)	21.3 (70.3)	25.0 (77.0)	24.6 (76.3)	20.1 (68.2)	13.9 (57.0)	7.5 (45.5)	1.7 (35.1)	12.5 (54.5)
Record low °C (°F)	−9.8 (14.4)	−12.6 (9.3)	−6.3 (20.7)	−0.2 (31.6)	6.7 (44.1)	12.9 (55.2)	18.5 (65.3)	16.8 (62.2)	11.0 (51.8)	0.8 (33.4)	−5.5 (22.1)	−13.1 (8.4)	−13.1 (8.4)
Average precipitation mm (inches)	52.2 (2.06)	53.3 (2.10)	79.3 (3.12)	77.2 (3.04)	90.5 (3.56)	198.2 (7.80)	224.3 (8.83)	179.0 (7.05)	76.4 (3.01)	57.1 (2.25)	54.6 (2.15)	35.3 (1.39)	1,177.4 (46.36)
Average precipitation days (≥ 0.1 mm)	9.3	8.9	10.3	9.8	9.7	11.1	12.6	12.5	8.2	7.8	8.1	7.1	115.4
Average snowy days	3.7	2.6	1.1	0	0	0	0	0	0	0	0.5	1.3	9.2
Average relative humidity (%)	73	72	70	69	70	76	80	79	77	73	74	71	74
Mean monthly sunshine hours	116.9	120.9	149.3	176.1	184.6	148.5	187.7	185.9	155.5	161.2	139.6	133.1	1,859.3
Percentage possible sunshine	37	38	40	45	43	35	43	46	42	46	45	43	42
Source: China Meteorological Administration all-time January high

== Economy ==
In 2007, the GDP in the Yangtze River reached 16.21 billion yuan. There are four towns and seven block offices. Part of Pukou District is now covered under the new strategic economic development area: Jiangbei New Area.
