= Taishan Subdistrict, Jilin City =

Taishan Subdistrict 泰山街道
- Subdistrict
- Location in Jilin
- Coordinates: 43°49′32″N 126°32′47″E
- Country: People's Republic of China
- Province: Jilin
- Prefecture-level city: Jilin City
- District: Fengman District
- Time zone: UTC+8 (China Standard)

Taishan Subdistrict (Chinese: 泰山街道; pinyin: Tàishān Jiēdào) is a subdistrict in Fengman District, Jilin City, Jilin, China. As of 2018, it has 8 residential communities under its administration.

== See also ==
- List of township-level divisions of Jilin
