= Taishan Subdistrict, Nanjing =

Taishan Subdistrict 泰山街道
- Subdistrict
- Location in Jiangsu
- Coordinates: 32.1366°N 118.7181°E
- Country: People's Republic of China
- Province: Jiangsu
- Prefecture-level city: Nanjing
- District: Pukou District
- Time zone: UTC+8 (China Standard)

Taishan Subdistrict (Chinese: 泰山街道; pinyin: Tàishān Jiēdào) is a subdistrict in Pukou District, Nanjing, Jiangsu, China. As of 2018, it has 15 residential communities and one village under its administration.

== See also ==
- List of township-level divisions of Jiangsu
