= Tai Shan (giant panda) =

Male giant panda (born 2005)

Tai Shan 泰山
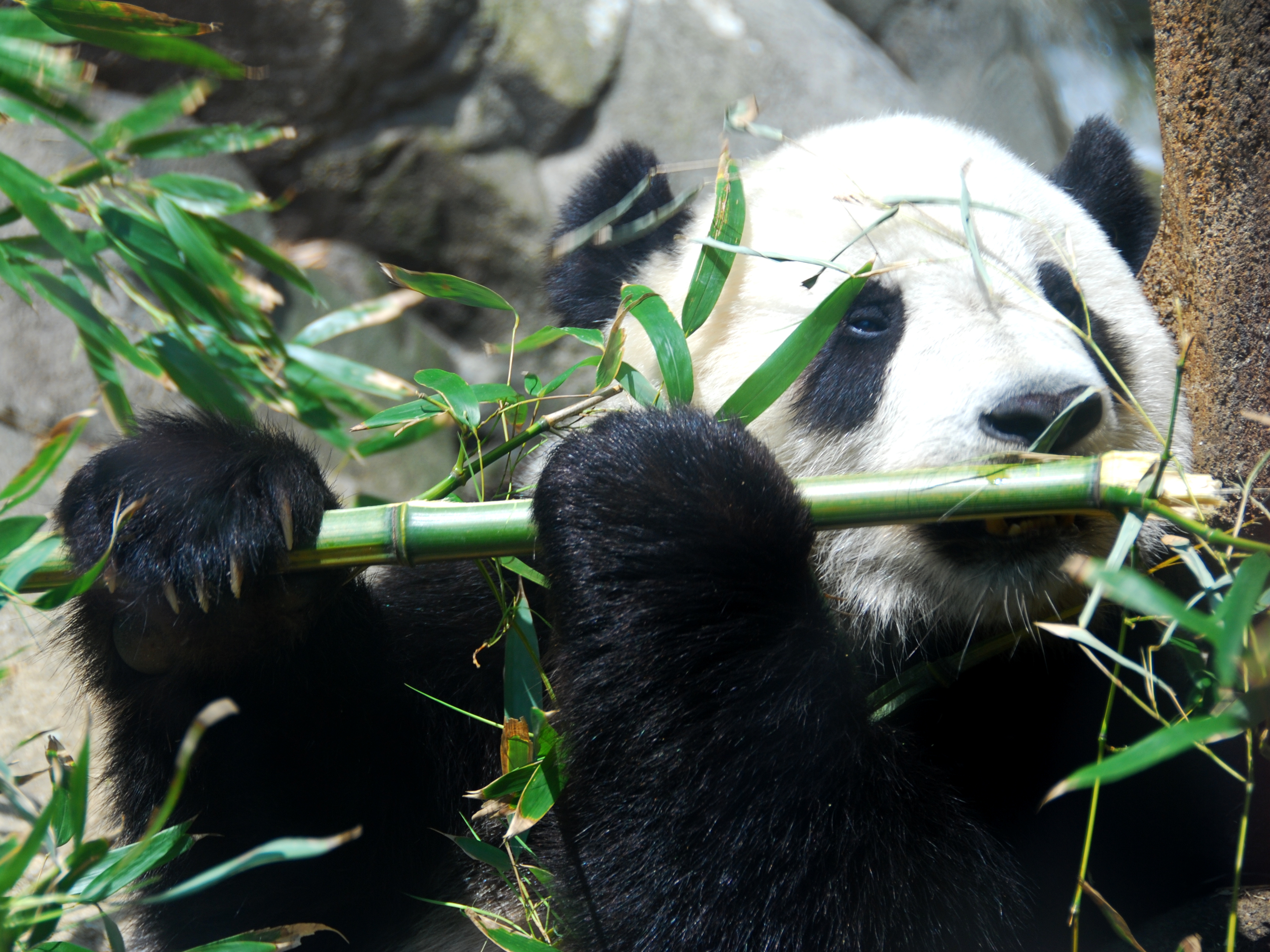
- Tai Shan in June 2007
- Species: Giant panda
- Sex: Male
- Born: July 9, 2005 (age 21); National Zoological Park, Washington, D.C., United States
- Residence: China Conservation and Research Center for the Giant Panda: Dujiangyan Base, Sichuan Province People's Republic of China
- Parents: Mei Xiang, Tian Tian
- Offspring: 3
- Named after: Butterstick (nickname)

Tai Shan (Note: Chinese: 泰山; pinyin: Tài Shān; lit. 'peaceful mountain', also known as Butterstick after birth and before naming) (born July 9, 2005) is a giant panda born at the National Zoo in Washington, D.C., United States. He was the first panda cub born at the National Zoo. He is the oldest brother of Bao Bao, Bei Bei, and Xiao Qi Ji.

Before being officially named, Tai Shan was referred to as "Butterstick" due to his size as a newborn. Tai Shan returned to China in February 2010, and his parents returned to China in December 2010. He has since fathered three cubs.

== Life and family ==
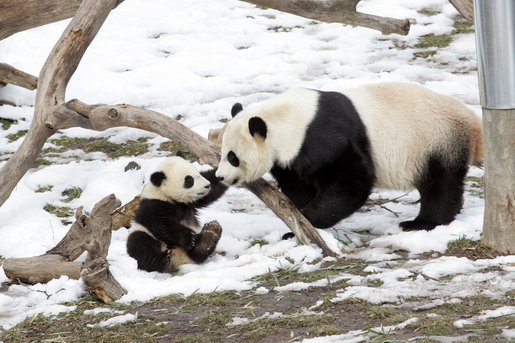
Tai Shan outside in the snow with his mother Mei Xiang in February 2006

Tai Shan is the first cub born to mother Mei Xiang and father Tian Tian, the National Zoo's second pair of giant pandas, on July 9, 2005, at 3:41 am. The first pair was Ling-Ling and Hsing-Hsing. Both of Tai Shan's parents were born at the China Research and Conservation Center for the Giant Panda in Wolong, Sichuan. After natural mating between the parents failed, Mei Xiang was artificially inseminated on March 11, 2005, with Tian Tian's sperm. Tai Shan is the oldest brother of Bao Bao (born 2013), Bei Bei (born 2015), and Xiao Qi Ji (born 2020). He had another younger sibling who died six days after being born in September 2012.

Per the agreement with China, the Chinese government can require that Tai Shan be sent to China any time after he reaches the age of two as he, like his parents, is Chinese property. Mei Xiang and Tian Tian were technically being "leased" to the National Zoo by the Chinese government in a ten-year, $10-million agreement, with the money going to panda conservation research in China. In April 2007, Chinese Ambassador Zhou Wenzhong presented Tai Shan a passport with an extended stay period to July 2009, without extra charge.

== Naming ==
Following a Chinese tradition, panda cubs are not named until they are 100 days old. Before he got a name, he was referred to as Butterstick because he was reported to be approximately the size of a stick of butter after his birth. The name caught on with bloggers, and became quite popular.

In September 2005, the National Zoo announced that his name would be chosen through an internet poll. There were five names included on the poll; all were traditional Chinese names approved by the China Wildlife Conservation Association. The choices were Hua Sheng ("China Washington" or "magnificent"), Sheng Hua ("Washington China" and "magnificent"), Tai Shan ("peaceful mountain"), Long Shan ("dragon mountain"), and Qiang Qiang ("strong, powerful"). "Butterstick" was not included as an option. The name Tai Shan was eventually chosen, as it had won 44 percent of the approximately 200,000 total votes cast.

== Media attention ==
Following Tai Shan's birth, he was closely monitored by zoologists, who assessed his condition every two minutes. He had become widely popular prior to his debut, which was on December 8, 2005. The National Zoo issued 13,000 free tickets, which were sold out within two hours. The panda cub was featured in two Animal Planet documentaries: A Panda Is Born and Baby Panda's First Year, which followed the National Zoo's giant panda breeding efforts and Tai Shan's birth.

== Move to China ==
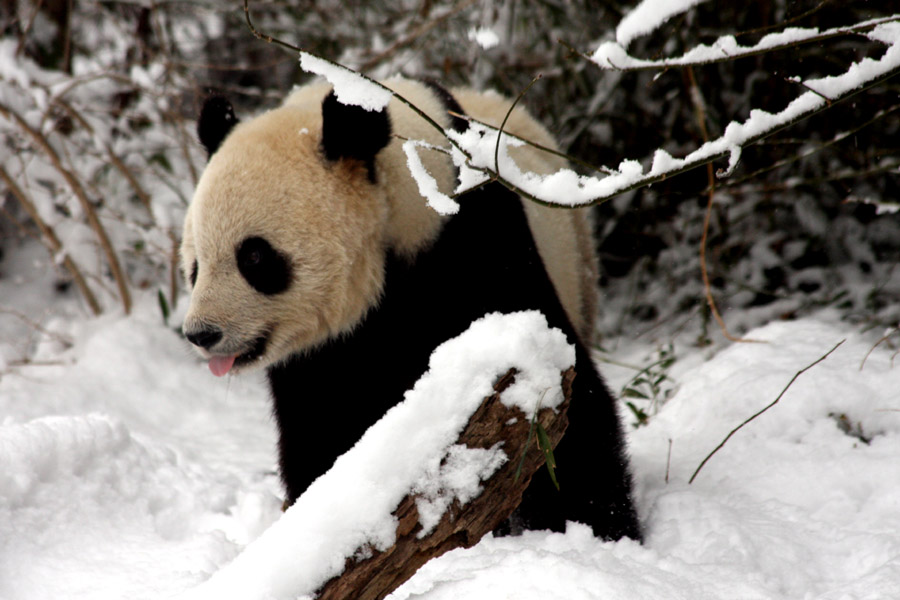
Tai Shan on his final full day at the National Zoo in Washington, D.C. in February 2010

The National Zoo announced on December 4, 2009, that Tai Shan would leave the zoo and be sent to China, in accordance with previous agreements. According to the original agreement, Tai Shan was to return to China two years after he was born. China had already allowed him to stay for another two and a half years beyond the initial agreement. He left D.C. for China on February 4, 2010, on the same flight as Mei Lan from Zoo Atlanta. He moved to the Bifengxia Panda Base, in Ya'an, Sichuan, and was later relocated to the Dujiangyan base of Sichuan Province's China Conservation and Research Center for the Giant Panda. Meanwhile, Mei Xiang and Tian Tian remained at the National Zoo until December 2010.

=== Fatherhood ===
Tai Shan mated with Wen Yu in April 2016. On August 19, 2020, he became the father of Bai Feng, one of the twin cubs born to Xiao Bai Tu. In 2022, he fathered Xiao Jiu and Hua Bao, who were born to Ying Hua.

== See also ==
- List of individual giant pandas
- List of individual bears
