= Kaifeng (disambiguation) =

Kaifeng is a city in Henan, China.

Kaifeng may also refer to:

- Kaifeng County, in Kaifeng, Henan, China
- Kaifeng, Sichuan, a town in Jiange County, Sichuan, China
- 35366 Kaifeng, a main-belt minor planet
- Kaifeng Jews
- Siege of Kaifeng (disambiguation)
  - Siege of Kaifeng (1232)

== See also ==
- Kai Feng (disambiguation), multiple people
