= Yuanshan =

Yuanshan may refer to these locations:

== Taiwan ==
- Yuanshan, Yilan (員山鄉), a township of Yilan County
- Yuanshan metro station (圓山站), a metro station of the Taipei Metro

== People's Republic of China ==
- Yuanshan Subdistrict (园山), in Longgang District, Shenzhen, Guangdong
- Yuanshan, Lianping County (元善), in Lianping County, Guangdong
- Yuanshan, Jiange County (元山), in Jiange County, Sichuan
- Yuanshan, Pingchang County (元山), in Pingchang County, Sichuan
