= Linping =

Linping may refer to:

Locations in China

- Linping District, in Hangzhou, Zhejiang Province
- Lianping County, in Heyuan, Guangdong Province. Romanised in the Chinese Postal Map as Linping

Metro stations

- Linping station, Hangzhou Metro
- Linping Road station, Shanghai Metro

Other

- Lin Bing (also called Lin Ping), female giant panda in Thailand
