= Panda pornography =

Movies for sexual arousal of giant pandas

Panda pornography (or panda porn) refers generally to videos depicting mating pandas, intended to promote sexual arousal in captive giant pandas. Under zoo conditions, the animals have, in general, proven unenthusiastic about mating. However, in their natural habitat in the wild, pandas are much more successful at mating, particularly as individuals are able to select for behavioral compatibility, as opposed to researchers choosing couples for genetic diversity purposes and trying to predict the narrow window when the females are in the mood. Panda pornography, along with other efforts to increase sexual arousal in pandas, has seen some success, but only in China. The giant panda was deemed an endangered species until 2016, when its placement on the IUCN Red List was changed to a vulnerable species.

== Background and history ==
Since the 1980s, zoologists have studied the sexual behaviors of giant pandas, a then-endangered species. The giant panda is threatened by persistent habitat destruction and fragmentation. Additionally, giant pandas have low fertility rates, which do not increase when they are in captivity, and female pandas, who ovulate once a year, are only receptive to mating for a maximum of 36 to 72 hours every spring. When pandas successfully mate, it is often difficult to determine if the female pandas are pregnant, and fetuses cannot be detected with an ultrasound due to their small size, so zookeepers have to observe behavioral and dietary changes. As a result, the Chinese government began sending pandas abroad in the 1990s so they could be artificially bred and released into the wild, but as of 2024, more pandas have been captured than released.

Panda pornography as a concept was popularized in early 2006, when, following a successful surge in giant panda reproduction in the United States and Japan, zoologists in Thailand led by Prasertak Puttrakul, showed several captive giant pandas at Chiang Mai Zoo a number of videos showing other giant pandas mating. Other methods, including the use of Viagra and sex toys to sexually stimulate pandas, have thus far been unsuccessful. Panda pornography is thought to be hardly used by most zookeepers, as the animals have generally shown a lack of enthusiasm, as well as poor eyesight; as a result, scent, sound, and social interactions over large areas are more important. The director of giant panda breeding in Chengdu, Zhang Zhihe, reports that the mating time of pandas ranges from 30 seconds to several minutes. In terms of pornography, recorded footage of mating pandas with both audio and video is used to draw the interest of pandas. In addition, pandas are made to do specialized exercises that strengthen the males' hind legs and stamina.

== Results ==
Methods to captively breed pandas, such as panda pornography, have garnered mixed results. Though the researchers behind the project believe it to be a success due to usage of mating videos for the animals, such success so far has not been achieved outside of China, where 31 cubs were born over a ten-month period following commencement of the experiment. Due to the efforts of the Chinese government, which include forest reforms and an increase in nature reserves in Sichuan, as of September 4, 2016, the giant panda is no longer considered an endangered species on the IUCN Red List, but instead, a vulnerable species. Despite the giant panda's recategorization, China's National Forestry and Grassland Administration told the Associated Press in 2021 that conservation efforts cannot be neglected, and continued to "emphasize the panda species' endangered status."

=== Lin Bing ===
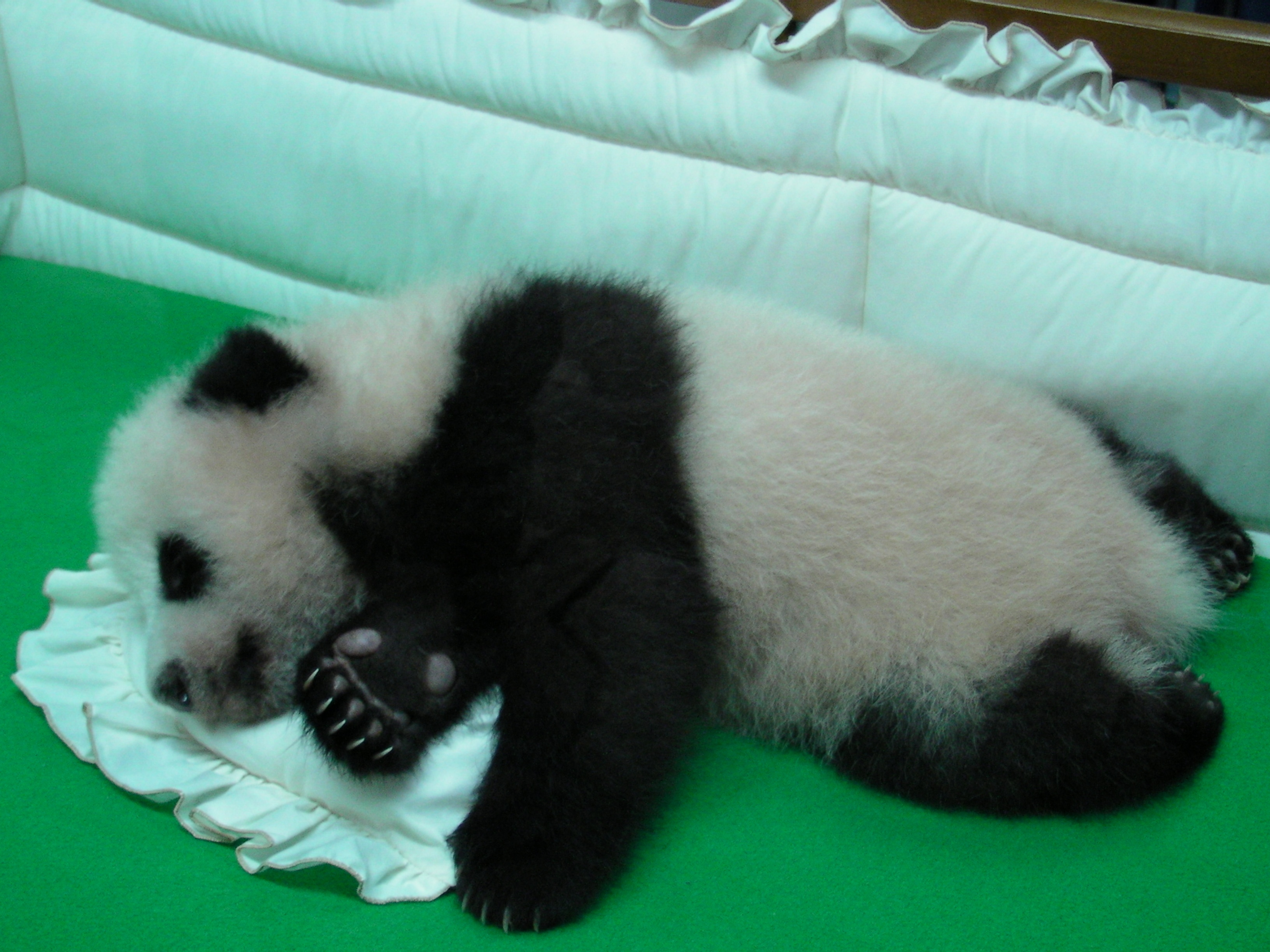
Lin Bing in August 2009

On May 27, 2009 at Chiang Mai Zoo, Thailand, Lin Bing (Thai: หลินปิง, Chinese: 林冰, lit. 'Forest of Ice'; also known as Lin Ping) was the first panda cub to be born in Thailand. Her father, Chuang Chuang, who was on loan, was shown panda pornography, but the method did not work. Therefore, Lin Bing had to be conceived via gamete intrafallopian transfer. On July 27, 2015, Lin Bing gave birth to twin female cubs at the Bifengxia Panda Base in Sichuan, China. Like her parents, Lin Bing is considered Chinese property. She was scheduled to be returned to China after turning two years old, in accordance with panda diplomacy, the practice of sending giant pandas from mainland China to other countries as a tool of diplomacy and wildlife conservation. Her birth significantly boosted tourism at Chiang Mai Zoo.
