= Gaoguan =

Gaoguan may refer to the following locations in China:

- Gaoguan, Guangdong (高莞镇), town in Lianping County
- Gaoguan, Liaoning (高官镇), town in Benxi Manchu Autonomous County
- Gaoguan, Chongqing (高观镇), town in Chengkou County
