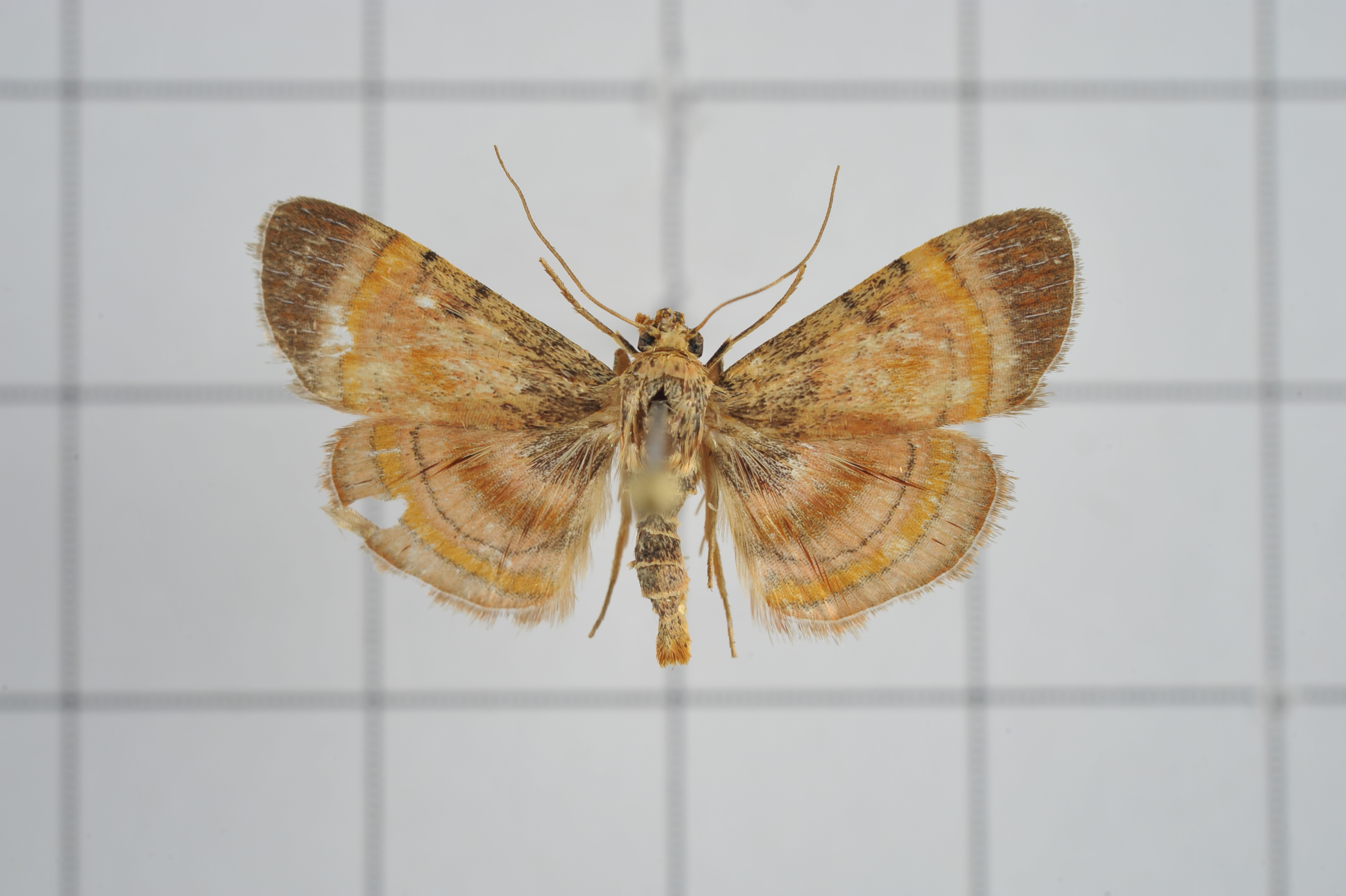

Scientific classification
- Kingdom: Animalia
- Phylum: Arthropoda
- Class: Insecta
- Order: Lepidoptera
- Family: Pyralidae
- Genus: Lista
- Species: L. insulsalis

Binomial name
- Lista insulsalis (Lederer, 1863)

Synonyms
- Paracme insulsalis Lederer, 1863; Stericta rubiginetincta Caradja, 1925

= Lista insulsalis =

Species of moth

Lista insulsalis is a species of moth of the family Pyralidae. It was described by Julius Lederer in 1863, and is known from Lianping, Guangdong; and Ningbo, Zhejiang, China.
