= Tushan, Sichuan =

Tushan 涂山镇
- Town
- Location in Sichuan
- Coordinates: 31°38′18″N 105°38′47″E
- Country: People's Republic of China
- Province: Sichuan
- Prefecture-level city: Guangyuan
- County: Jiange County
- Time zone: UTC+8 (China Standard)

Tushan (Chinese: 涂山; pinyin: Túshān) is a town under the administration of Jiange County, Sichuan, China. As of 2023, it administers Tushan Village, Taihe Village (太和村), Houzipu Village (厚子铺村), Guan'erpu Village (罐儿铺村), Donghe Village (东河村), and Yingxin Village (迎新村).
