= Captive breeding =

Intentional breeding of wild organisms by humans

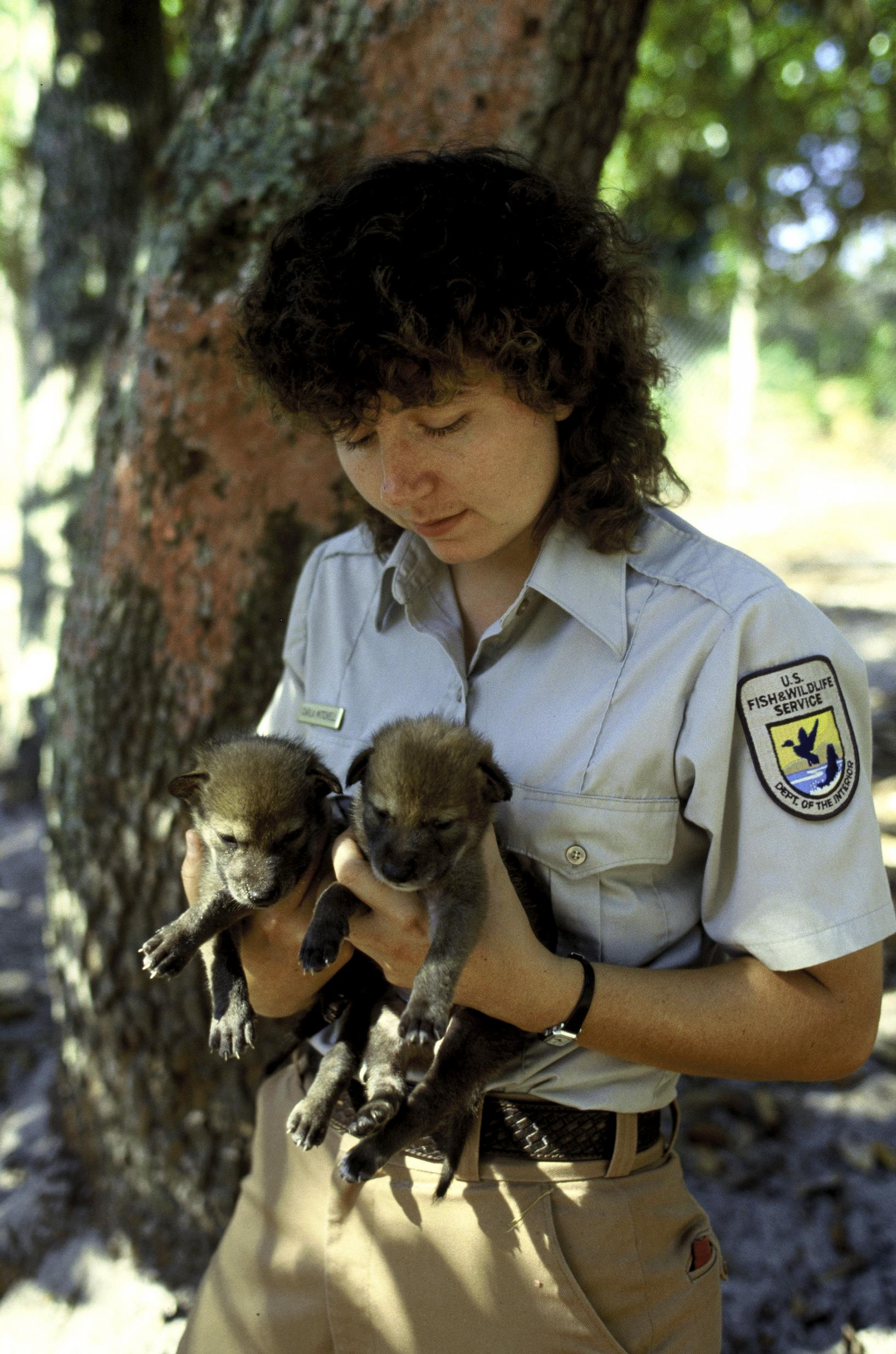
USFWS staff with two red wolf pups bred in captivity

Captive breeding, also known as captive propagation, is a conservation strategy aimed at preserving endangered or threatened species by breeding them in controlled environments, such as wildlife reserves, zoos, botanic gardens, and other conservation facilities. It is sometimes employed to help species that are being threatened by the effects of human activities such as climate change, habitat loss, fragmentation, overhunting or fishing, pollution, predation, disease, and parasitism.

For many species, relatively little is known about the conditions needed for successful breeding. Information about a species' reproductive biology may be critical to the success of a captive breeding program. In some cases a captive breeding program can save a species from extinction, but for success, breeders must consider many factors—including genetic, ecological, behavioral, and ethical issues. Most successful attempts involve the cooperation and coordination of many institutions. The efforts put into captive breeding can aid in education about conservation because species in captivity are closer to the public than their wild conspecifics. These accomplishments from the continued breeding of species for generations in captivity is also aided by extensive research efforts ex-situ and in-situ.

== History ==
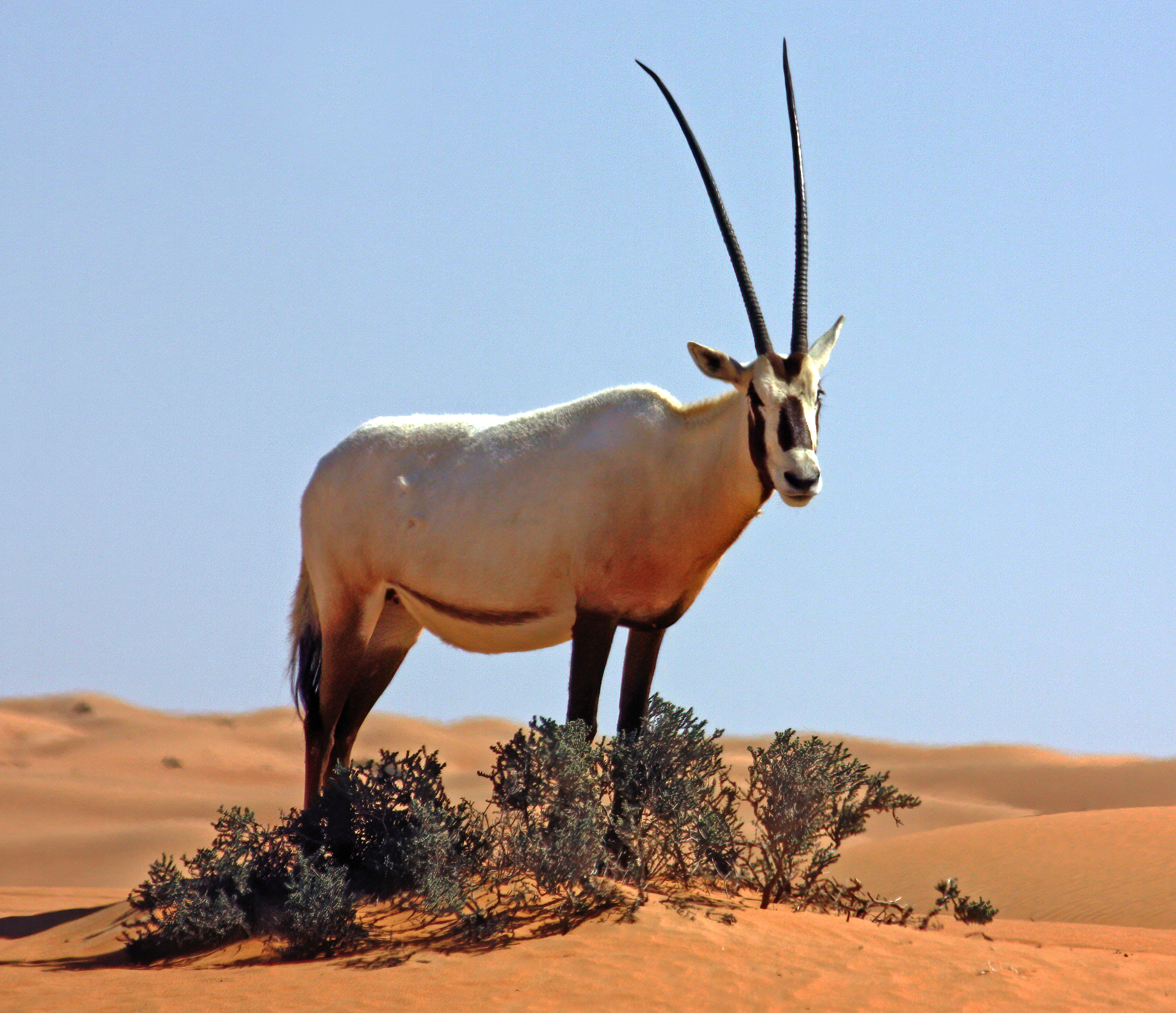
The Arabian Oryx is one of the first animals reintroduced via a captive breeding program.

Captive breeding techniques began with the first human domestication of animals such as goats, and plants like wheat, at least 10,000 years ago. These practices were expanded with the rise of the first zoos, which started as royal menageries such as the one at Hierakonpolis, capital in the Predynastic Period of Egypt.

The first actual captive breeding programs were only started in the 1960s. These programs, such as the Arabian Oryx breeding program from the Phoenix Zoo in 1962, were aimed at the reintroduction of these species into the wild. These programs expanded under The Endangered Species Act of 1973 of the Nixon Administration which focused on protecting endangered species and their habitats to preserve biodiversity. Since then, research and conservation have been housed in zoos, such as the Institute for Conservation Research at the San Diego Zoo founded in 1975 and expanded in 2009, which have contributed to the successful conservation efforts of species such as the Hawaiian Crow.

== Coordination ==
The breeding of species of conservation concern is coordinated by cooperative breeding programs containing international studbooks and coordinators, who evaluate the roles of individual animals and institutions from a global or regional perspective. These studbooks contain information on birth date, gender, location, and lineage (if known), which helps determine survival and reproduction rates, number of founders of the population, and inbreeding coefficients. A species coordinator reviews the information in studbooks and determines a breeding strategy that would produce most advantageous offspring.

If two compatible animals are found at different zoos, the animals may be transported for mating, but this is stressful, which could in turn make mating less likely. However, this is still a popular breeding method among European zoological organizations. Artificial fertilization (by shipping semen) is another option, but male animals can experience stress during semen collection, and the same goes for females during the artificial insemination procedure. Furthermore, this approach yields lower-quality semen, because shipping requires extending the life of the sperm for the transit time.

There are regional programmes for the conservation of endangered species:

- Americas: Species Survival Plan SSP (Association of Zoos and Aquariums AZA, Canadian Association of Zoos and Aquariums CAZA), Saving Animals from Extinction SAFE (Association of Zoos and Aquariums AZA)
- Europe: European Endangered Species Programme EEP (European Association of Zoos and Aquaria EAZA)
- Australasia: Australasian Species Management Program ASMP (Zoo and Aquarium Association ZAA)
- Africa: African Preservation Program APP (African Association of Zoological Gardens and Aquaria PAAZAB)
- Japan: Conservation activities of Japanese Association of Zoos and Aquariums JAZA
- South Asia: Conservation activities of South Asian Zoo Association for Regional Cooperation SAZARC
- South East Asia: Conservation activities of South East Asian Zoos Association SEAZA

== Challenges ==
=== Genetics ===
The objective of many captive populations is to hold similar levels of genetic diversity to what is found in wild populations. As captive populations are usually small and maintained in artificial environments, genetics factors such as adaptation, inbreeding and loss of diversity can be a major concern.

==== Domestication adaptations ====
Adaptive differences between plant and animal populations arise due to variations in environmental pressures. In the case of captive breeding prior to reintroduction into the wild, it is possible for species to evolve to adapt to the captive environment, rather than their natural environment. Reintroducing a plant or animal to an environment dissimilar to the one they were originally from can cause fixation of traits that may not be suited for that environment leaving the individual disadvantaged. Selection intensity, initial genetic diversity, and effective population size can impact how much the species adapts to its captive environment. Modeling works indicate that the duration of the programs (i.e., time from the foundation of the captive population to the last release event) is an important determinant of reintroduction success. Success is maximized for intermediate project duration allowing the release of a sufficient number of individuals, while minimizing the number of generations undergoing relaxed selection in captivity. Can be minimized by reducing the number of generations in captivity, minimizing selection for captive adaptations by creating environment similar to natural environment and maximizing the number of immigrants from wild populations.

==== Genetic diversity ====
One consequence of small captive population size is the increased impact of genetic drift, where genes have the potential to fix or disappear completely by chance, thereby reducing genetic diversity. Other factors that can impact genetic diversity in a captive population are bottlenecks and initial population size. Bottlenecks, such as rapid decline in the population or a small initial population impacts genetic diversity. Loss can be minimized by establishing a population with a large enough number of founders to genetically represent the wild population, maximize population size, maximize ratio of effective population size to actual population size, and minimize the number of generations in captivity.

==== Inbreeding ====
Inbreeding is when organisms mate with closely related individuals, lowering heterozygosity in a population. Although inbreeding can be relatively common, when it results in a reduction in fitness it is known as inbreeding depression. The detrimental effects of inbreeding depression are especially prevalent in smaller populations and can therefore be extensive in captive populations. To make these populations the most viable, it is important to monitor and reduce the effects of deleterious allele expression caused by inbreeding depression and to restore genetic diversity. Comparing inbred populations against non-inbred or less-inbred populations can help determine the extent of detrimental effects if any are present. Closely monitoring the possibility of inbreeding within the captive bred population is also key to the success of reintroduction into the species' native habitat.

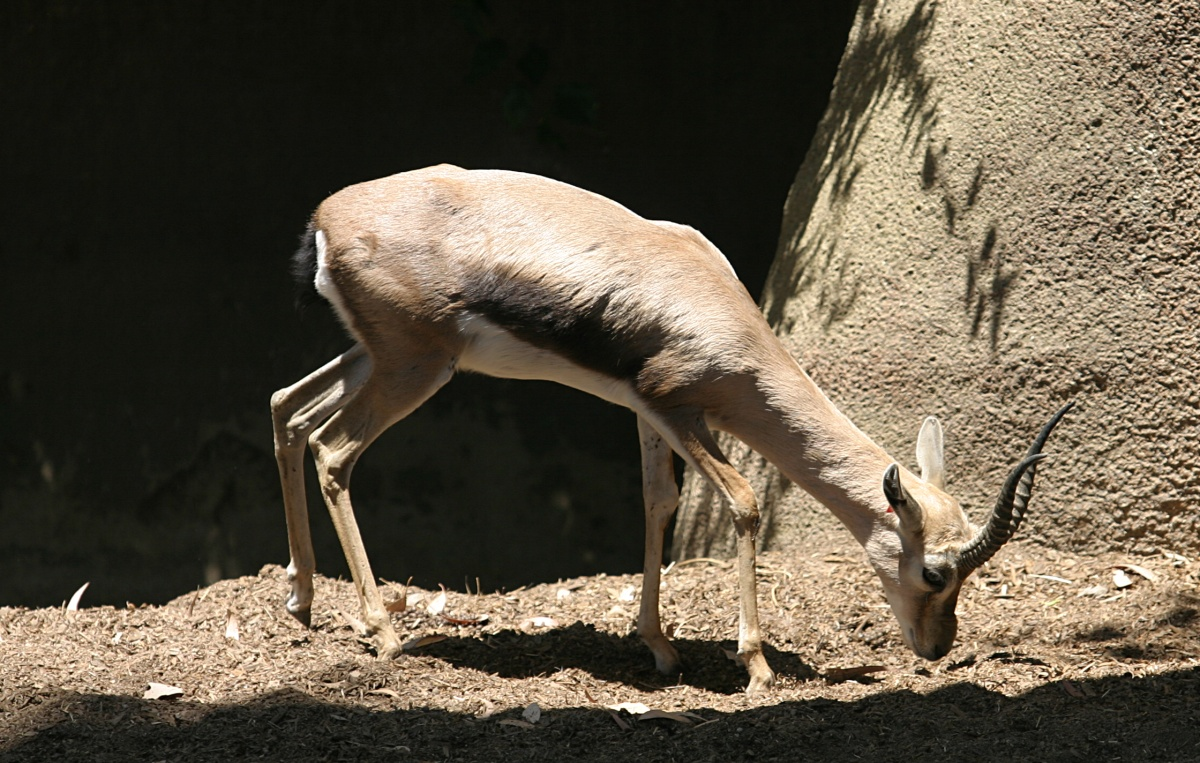
The Speke's Gazelle was the focus of a captive breeding program centered on determining the effect of selection on reducing genetic load.

===== Outbreeding =====
Outbreeding is when organisms mate with unrelated individuals, increasing heterozygosity in a population. Although new diversity is often beneficial, if there are large genetic differences between the two individuals it can result in outbreeding depression. This is a reduction in fitness, similar to that of inbreeding depression, but arises from a number of different mechanisms, including taxonomic issues, chromosomal differences, sexual incompatibility, or adaptive differences between the individuals. A common cause is chromosomal ploidy differences and hybridization between individuals leading to sterility. The best example is in the orangutan, which, prior to taxonomic revisions in the 1980s would be commonly mated in captive populations producing hybrid orangutans with lower fitness. If chromosomal ploidy is ignored during reintroduction, restoration efforts would fail due to sterile hybrids in the wild. If there are large genetic differences between individuals originally from distant populations, those individuals should only be bred in circumstances where no other mates exist.

==== Behavior changes ====
Captive breeding can contribute to changes in behavior in animals that have been reintroduced to the wild. Released animals are commonly less capable of hunting or foraging for food, which leads to starvation, possibly because the young animals spent the critical learning period in captivity. Released animals often display more risk-taking behavior and fail to avoid predators. Golden lion tamarin mothers often die in the wild before having offspring because they cannot climb and forage. This leads to continuing population declines despite reintroduction as the species are unable to produce viable offspring. Training can improve anti-predator skills, but its effectiveness varies.

Salmon bred in captivity have shown similar declines in caution and are killed by predators when young. However, salmon that were reared in an enriched environment with natural prey showed less risk-taking behaviors and were more likely to survive.

A study on mice has found that after captive breeding had been in place for multiple generations and these mice were "released" to breed with wild mice, that the captive-born mice bred amongst themselves instead of with the wild mice. This suggests that captive breeding may affect mating preferences, and has implications for the success of a reintroduction program.

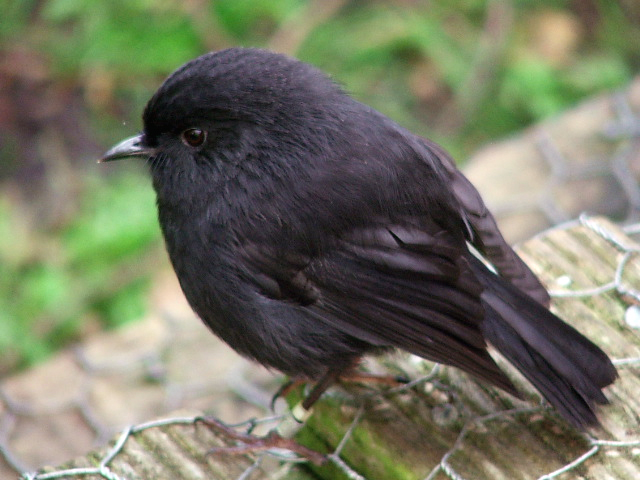
Chatham Island Black Robin on Rangatira Island, New Zealand.

Human mediated recovery of species can unintentionally promote maladaptive behaviors in wild populations. In 1980 the number of wild Chatham Island Black Robins was reduced to a single mating pair. Intense management of populations helped the population recover and by 1998 there were 200 individuals. During recovery scientists observed "rim laying" an egg laying habit where individuals laid eggs on the rim of the nest instead of the center. Rim laid eggs never hatched. To combat this land managers pushed the egg to the center of the nest, which greatly increased reproduction. However, by allowing this maladaptive trait to persist, over half the population were now rim layers. Genetic studies found that this was an autosomal dominant mendelian trait that was selected for due to human intervention.

Another challenge presented to captive breeding is an attempt to establish multi-partner mating systems in captive populations. It can be difficult to replicate the circumstances surrounding multiple mate systems and allow it to occur naturally in captivity due to limited housing space and lack of information. When brought into captivity, there is no guarantee that a pair of animals will pair bond or that all the members of a population will participate in breeding. Throughout facilities, there is limited housing space so allowing for mate choice may establish genetic issues in the population. A lack of information surrounding the effects of mating systems on captive populations can also present issues when attempting to breed. These mating systems are not always fully understood and the effects captivity may have on them cannot be known until they are studied in greater capacity.

== Successes ==
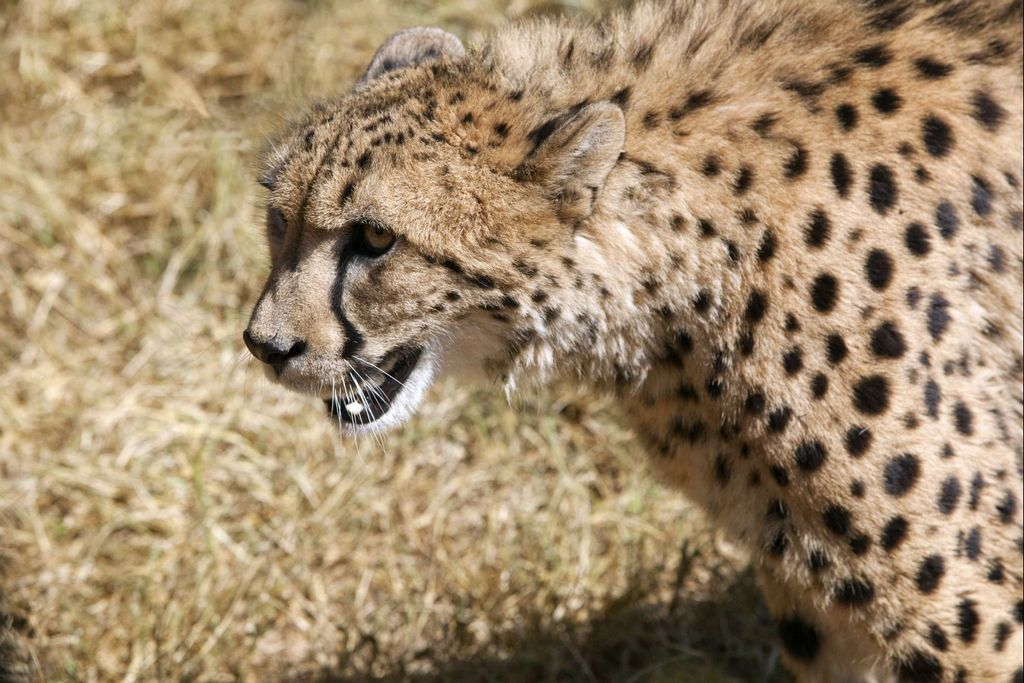
A cheetah at the De Wildt Cheetah and Wildlife Centre.

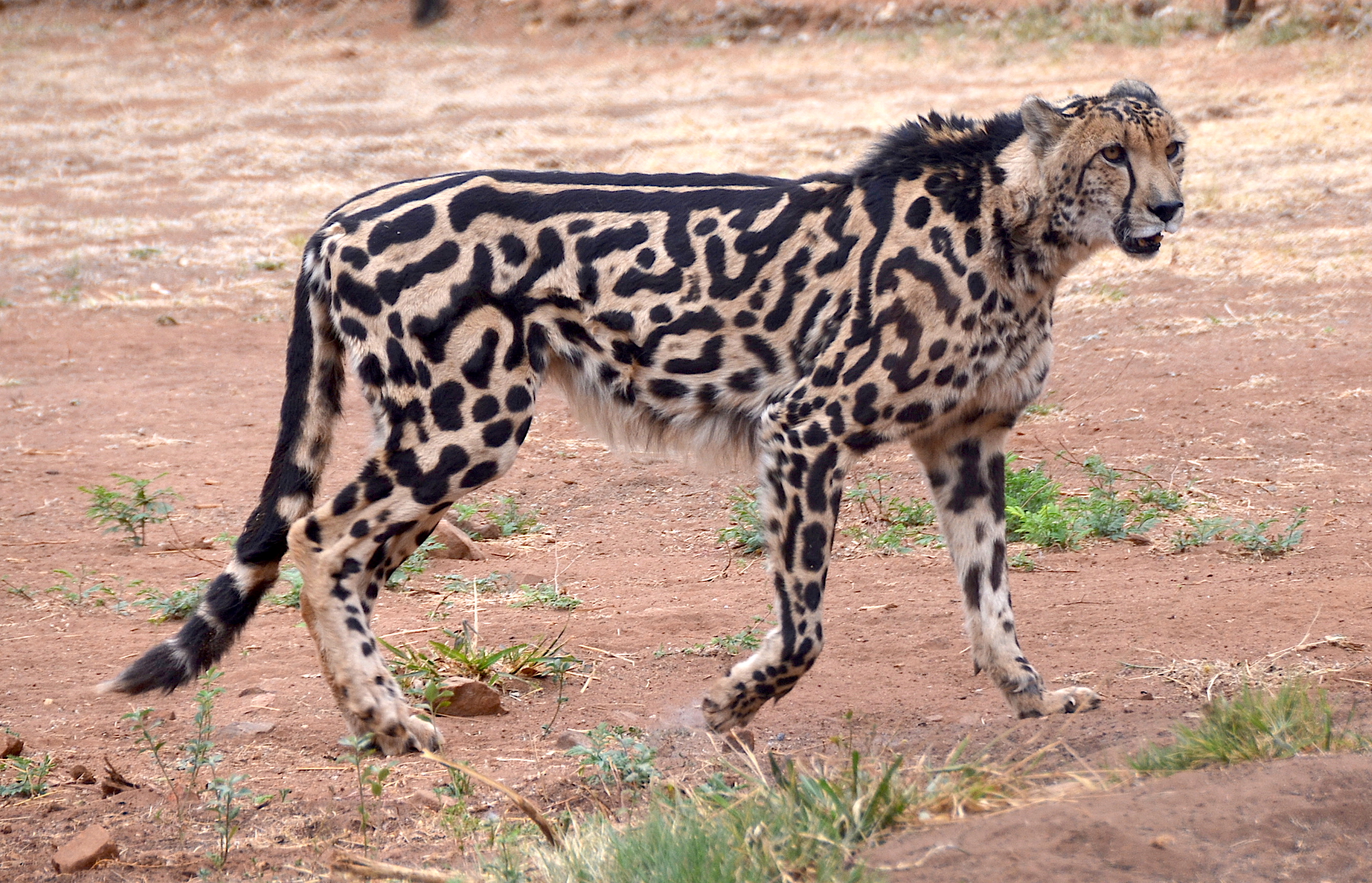
King cheetah, a variety of cheetah with a rare mutation at De Wildt Cheetah and Wildlife Centre

The Phoenix Zoo had an Arabian Oryx breeding program in 1962. They were able to successfully breed over 200 individuals from a lineage of only 9 original founders. Members from this founding population were then sent to many other facilities worldwide, and many breeding herds were established. In 1982, the first of the population was reintroduced back into Oman, and over the next two decades, their population increased over time and was able to successfully reestablish in native regions. Arabian Oryx have now been reintroduced into areas such as Saudi Arabia, Oman, and Israel and they now number 1,100, showing a recovery thanks to captive breeding efforts.

The De Wildt Cheetah and Wildlife Centre, established in South Africa in 1971, has a cheetah captive breeding program. Between 1975 and 2005, 242 litters were born with a total of 785 cubs. The survival rate of cubs was 71.3% for the first twelve months and 66.2% for older cubs, validating the fact that cheetahs can be bred successfully (and their endangerment decreased). It also indicated that failure in other breeding habitats may be due to "poor" sperm morphology.

Przewalski's horse, the only horse species never to have been domesticated, was recovered from the brink of extinction by a captive breeding program, and successfully reintroduced in the 1990s to the Mongolia, with more than 750 wild roaming Przewalski's horses as of 2020.

The Galápagos tortoise population, once reaching as low in population as 12 remaining individuals, as of 2014 was recovered to more than 2000 by a captive breeding program. A further 8 tortoise species were supported by captive breeding programs in the island chain.

Wild Tasmanian devils have declined by 90% due to a transmissible cancer called Devil Facial Tumor Disease. A captive insurance population program was started, but the captive breeding rates as of 2012 were lower than they needed to be. Keeley, Fanson, Masters, and McGreevy (2012) sought to "increase our understanding of the estrous cycle of the devil and elucidate potential causes of failed male-female pairings" by examining temporal patterns of fecal progestogen and corticosterone metabolite concentrations. They found that the majority of unsuccessful females were captive-born, suggesting that if the species' survival depended solely on captive breeding, the population would probably disappear.

In 2010, the Oregon Zoo found that Columbia Basin pygmy rabbit pairings based on familiarity and preferences resulted in a significant increase in breeding success.

In 2019, researchers trying to breed captive American paddlefish and Russian sturgeon separately inadvertently bred sturddlefish - a hybrid fish between the two fish.

== Research ==
Captive breeding can also be a research tool to understand the reproductive physiology and reproductive behaviors of species. In order to successfully breed animals, there must be an understanding of their mating systems, their reproductive physiology, and behavior or mating rituals. Through captive breeding programs, these factors can be measured in a finite setting and the results can be interpreted and used to aid in ex-situ and in-situ conservation. Through a greater understanding of these systems, captive breeding efforts can have greater success when attempting to reproduce a species. A lot of research about elephant reproductive physiology and estrus cycles has been conducted in captivity and a greater understanding of how these factors play into breeding attempts can be established. Behavioral research quantifies the effects of how estrus plays a role in the herds behaviors and how this effects the bulls of a herd. This research can help facilities monitor for behavior changes in their herd and conduct successful breeding attempts through this understanding. Research helps with better understanding these physiological systems which in turn helps increase successful breeding attempts and allows for more generations to be brought up in captivity.

Not only does physiological research aid in captive breeding attempts, but multi-generational research is also another important research tool that is conducted on different species and genetic changes can be tracked through different lineages brought up in captivity. Genetic changes throughout a specific lineage can help provide breeding recommendations and allow for genetic diversity within a captive population to remain high. Studbooks are an important resource that contains records of species lineages to track all of the data throughout breeding histories to allow facilities to understand the genetic history of an individual, the births and deaths of involved in the captive breeding of a certain species, and the parentage of certain individual animals. These studbooks come from years of effort of conducting research involving captive breeding programs, which allows facilities view the history surrounding certain individuals and then work together to evaluate the best plan of action to increase breeding success and genetic diversity within certain species populations in captivity. This genetic record keeping is also used in order to understand phylogeny and to better understand fitness changes that may occur over generations in captive populations. This form of record keeping helps aid in research surrounding population genetics in order to evaluate the best method to sustain high genetic variation within captive populations.

Research conducted on captive breeding populations is also important when creating SAFE's and SSP's for a certain species. Studies in behavior are important when developing captive breeding programs because they allow facilities to understand an animals response to captivity and allows facilities to adapt proper housing conditions for the animals. Populations that are currently being propagated in captivity are very important research tools for understanding how to carry out successful propagation of a certain species. This research allows the knowledge to be passed on to more facilities allowing for more breeding programs to be developed in order to increase the genetic diversity of captive populations. The research conducted on breeding populations is also an important gateway into understanding other aspects of an animal such as social dynamics, nutrition and diet requirements, and demographics to allow for captive populations to prosper.

== Methods used ==
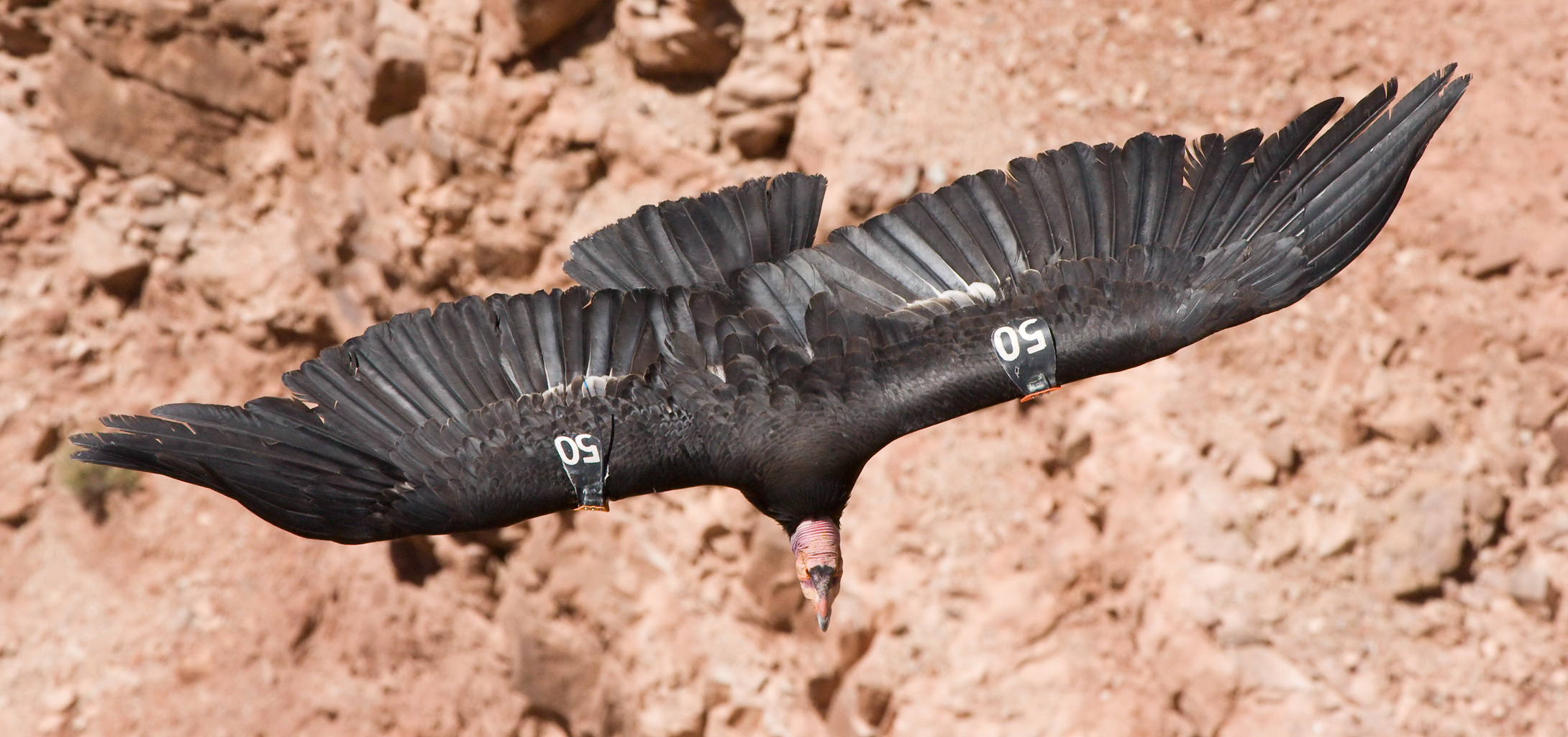
Every known individual of the California condor population has been captured and then bred using research from microsatellite regions in their genome.

To found a captive breeding population with adequate genetic diversity, breeders usually select individuals from different source populations—ideally, at least 20–30 individuals. Founding populations for captive breeding programs have often had fewer individuals than ideal because of their threatened state, leaving them more susceptible to challenges such as inbreeding depression.

To overcome challenges of captive breeding such as adaptive differences, loss of genetic diversity, inbreeding depression, and outbreeding depression and get desired results, captive breeding programs use many monitoring methods. Artificial insemination is used to produce the desired offspring from individuals who do not mate naturally to reduce effects of mating closely related individuals such as inbreeding. Methods as seen in panda pornography allow programs to mate chosen individuals by encouraging mating behavior. A concern in captive breeding is to minimize the effects of breeding closely related individuals, microsatellite regions from an organism's genome can be used to determine amounts of relationship among founders to minimize relatedness and pick the most distant individuals to breed. This method has successfully been used in the captive breeding of the California condor and the Guam rail. The maximum avoidance of inbreeding (MAI) scheme allows control at a group level rather than an individual level by rotating individuals between groups to avoid inbreeding.

Facilities can use intensive housing compared to group housing to allow for easier reproductive success and create more genetic diversity within a population. Intensive housing is when a species is forced into monogamy so only two individuals mate with each other, compared to group housing where the entire population is kept in the same space to try and replicate multi-partner breeding systems. When using intensive housing and forcing monogamy to take place, it is seen that inbreeding is lowered and a greater genetic diversity results. Intensive housing efforts were used with Tasmanian Devil populations in captivity compared to allowing for group mate choice. This helped increase the populations reproductive success in captivity and saw less inbreeding depression within the population. Using intensive housing to help establish a genetically healthy population in captivity can allow facilities to further increase conservation efforts of a species and combat genetic issues that may arise in the captive population.

== New technologies ==
=== Assisted reproduction technology (ART): Artificial insemination ===
Getting captive wild animals to breed naturally can be a difficult task. Giant pandas for example lose interest in mating once they are captured, and female giant pandas only experience estrus once a year, which only lasts for 48 to 72 hours. Many researchers have turned to artificial insemination in an attempt to increase the populations of endangered animals. It may be used for many reasons, including to overcome physical breeding difficulties, to allow a male to inseminate a much larger number of females, to control the paternity of offspring, and to avoid injury incurred during natural mating. It also creates more genetically diverse captive populations, enabling captive facilities to easily share genetic material with each other without the need to move animals. Scientist of the Justus-Liebig-University of Giessen, Germany, from the working group of Michael Lierz, developed a novel technique for semen collection and artificial insemination in parrots producing the world's first macaw by assisted reproduction.

=== Cryopreservation ===
Animal species can be preserved in gene banks, which consist of a cryogenic facilities used to store live sperm, eggs, or embryos in ultracold conditions. The Zoological Society of San Diego has established a "frozen zoo" to store frozen tissue from the world's rarest and most endangered species samples using cryopreservation techniques. At present, there has been more than 355 species, including mammals, reptiles, and birds. Cryopreservation can be performed as oocyte cryopreservation before fertilization, or as embryo cryopreservation after fertilization. Cryogenically preserved specimens can potentially be used to revive breeds that are endangered or extinct, for breed improvement, crossbreeding, research and development. This method can be used for virtually indefinite storage of material without deterioration over a much greater time-period relative to all other methods of ex situ conservation. However, cryo-conservation can be an expensive strategy and requires long term hygienic and economic commitment for germplasms to remain viable. Cryo-conservation can also face unique challenges based on the species, as some species have a reduced survival rate of frozen germplasm, but cryobiology is a field of active research and many studies concerning plants are underway.

An example of the use of cryoconservation to prevent the extinction of a livestock breed is the case of the Hungarian Grey cattle, or Magya Szurke. Hungarian Grey cattle were once a dominant breed in southeastern Europe with a population of 4.9 million head in 1884. They were mainly used for draft power and meat. However, the population had decreased to 280,000 head by the end of World War II and eventually reached the low population of 187 females and 6 males from 1965 to 1970. The breed's decreased use was due primarily to the mechanization of agriculture and the adoption of major breeds, which yield higher milk production. The Hungarian government launched a project to preserve the breed, as it possesses valuable traits, such as stamina, calving ease, disease resistance, and easy adaptation to a variety of climates. The government program included various conservation strategies, including the cryopreservation of semen and embryos. The Hungarian government's conservation effort brought the population up to 10,310 in 2012, which shows significant improvement using cryoconservation.

=== Cloning ===
The best current cloning techniques have an average success rate of 9.4 percent, when working with familiar species such as mice, while cloning wild animals is usually less than 1 percent successful. In 2001, a cow named Bessie gave birth to a cloned Asian gaur, an endangered species, but the calf died after two days. In 2003, a banteng was successfully cloned, followed by three African wildcats from a thawed frozen embryo. These successes provided hope that similar techniques (using surrogate mothers of another species) might be used to clone extinct species. Anticipating this possibility, tissue samples from the last bucardo (Pyrenean ibex) were frozen in liquid nitrogen immediately after it died in 2000. Researchers are also considering cloning endangered species such as the giant panda and cheetah. However, cloning of animals is opposed by animal-groups due to the number of cloned animals that suffer from malformations before they die.

=== Interspecific pregnancy ===
A potential technique for aiding in reproduction of endangered species is interspecific pregnancy, implanting embryos of an endangered species into the womb of a female of a related species, carrying it to term. It has been used for the Spanish Ibex and Houbara bustard.

== Conservation education ==
Captive breeding is an important tool used in modern education of conservation issues because it provides a framework for how we care about species and allows institutions to show the beauty that is contained in our natural environment. These practices of captive breeding can be used to explain the function of the modern-day facilities and their importance in conservation. Through continued breeding efforts populations can continue to be displayed in closer proximity to the public and their role in conservation can be explained. These explanations help show a side of the world many people will not engage with because conservation is not something that is inherently known about, it must be shown and taught to others to raise awareness of the issues around the globe. By allowing people to view these species in captivity, it allows facilities to explain the issues they face in the wild and advocate for the conservation of these species and their natural habitats.

Institutions focus efforts on large charismatic species, such as elephants, giraffes, rhinos etc., because these draw more visitors to institutions and garner more attention from the public. While a lot of these charismatic megafauna do draw more attention than other species, we can still use captive breeding programs and facilities involving other species to educate the public about a broader range of issues. Bristol Zoo Gardens in the United Kingdom has maintained a species of medicinal leech (Hirudo medicinalis) in their facility to use as an education exhibit. Leeches normally have a negative connotation surrounded by them but they have been used as an important tool in medicine. The display at Bristol Zoo Gardens provides an educational piece and tells the story of a woman who sold leeches to the locals around her for medicinal purposes. This display advocates for a smaller species that would not normally be covered by facilities, but they are well maintained in this facility and are active conservation of the species is being done because of its significance around humans and in the environment. Facilities can use captive breeding for a number of possibilities, such as educating the populace about captive breeding which provides conservation advocacy and a maintenance of these populations helps make the conservation issues surrounding the species more prevalent in the minds of the general public.

== Ethical considerations ==
With successes, captive-breeding programs have proven successful throughout history. Notable examples include the American black-footed ferret; in 1986, a dwindling wild population of only 18 was eventually raised to 500. A Middle-Eastern antelope, the Arabian oryx was hunted over centuries, reducing their population by the late 1960s to merely eleven living animals; not wanting to lose such a symbolic animal of the Middle East, these individuals were rescued and donated by King Saud to the Phoenix Zoo, the San Diego Zoo and their (at the time) newly developed, 1,800-acre (730 ha) Wild Animal Park, prior to his death in 1969. From these actions, those eleven oryx were successfully bred from the brink of extinction, and would go on to be re-released in the deserts of Jordan, Oman, Bahrain, United Arab Emirates and Qatar. Starting in 1980, the first animals were set free. Currently, the wild animals number around 1,000 individuals, with a further 6,000-7,000 in zoos and breeding centres internationally.

While captive breeding can be an ideal solution for preventing endangered animals from facing serious threats of extinction there are still reasons why these programs can occasionally do more harm than good. Some detrimental effects include delays in understanding optimal conditions required for reproduction, failure to reach self-sustaining levels or provide sufficient stock for release, loss of genetic diversity due to inbreeding, and poor success in reintroductions despite available captive-bred young. Although it has been proven that captive breeding programs have yielded negative genetic effects in decreasing the fitness of captive-bred organisms, there is no direct evidence to show that this negative effect also decreases the overall fitness of their wild-born descendants.

It has been argued that animals should be released from captivity programs for four main reasons: a lack of sufficient space due to overly successful breeding programs, closure of facilities due to financial reasons, pressure from animal rights advocacy groups, and to aid the conservation of endangered species. Additionally, there are many ethical complications to reintroducing animals born in captivity back into the wild. For example, when scientists were reintroducing a rare species of toad back into the Mallorcan wild in 1993, a potentially deadly fungus that could kill frogs and toads was unintentionally introduced. It is also important to maintain the organism's original habitat, or replicate that specific habitat for species survival.

There are ethical issues surrounding if a species truly needs human intervention and if the resources going toward the captive breeding of these species cannot be allocated to other areas. Some populations may not need intervention because they were never extinction-prone in the first place such as the peregrine falcon. The population of peregrine falcons had a crash in the 1950s and 1960s due to the effect of pesticides on egg production and species survival, causing a decline in the population. Many facilities at the time in the U.S. and in European countries brought in peregrine falcons in order to help their declining population and establish a steady population through captive breeding. It was later shown through research conducted on the reproductive success of Peregrine Falcons and an analysis of their population that human intervention was not necessary in order for the population to recover and reach a steady point of equilibrium. This raises the question of should efforts on captive breeding and population establishment be done with human intervention or should efforts be carried out to prevent the source of the issue. The efforts and finances used to help bring about new Peregrine Falcon populations could have been used to prevent some level of pollution or to help breeding effort for extinction-prone species who truly need intervention.

== See also ==
- Breeding in the wild
- European Endangered Species Programme (EEP)
- Ex-situ conservation
- Panda pornography
- Species Survival Plan or SSP
- World Conference on Breeding Endangered Species in Captivity as an Aid to their Survival or WCBESCAS
- ZooBorns
