= Lista plinthochroa =

Scientific classification
- Kingdom: Animalia
- Phylum: Arthropoda
- Class: Insecta
- Order: Lepidoptera
- Family: Pyralidae
- Genus: Lista
- Species: L. plinthochroa

Binomial name
- Lista plinthochroa (West, 1931)

Synonyms
- Stericta plinthochroa West, 1931

Species of moth

Lista plinthochroa is a species of moth of the family Pyralidae. It was described by W. West in 1931 and is known from the Philippines.
