= Lista monticola =

Scientific classification
- Kingdom: Animalia
- Phylum: Arthropoda
- Class: Insecta
- Order: Lepidoptera
- Family: Pyralidae
- Genus: Lista
- Species: L. monticola

Binomial name
- Lista monticola Yamanaka, 2000

Species of moth

Lista monticola is a species of moth of the family Pyralidae. It was described by H. Yamanaka in 2000 and is known from Nepal (it was described from Godavari, Bagmati).
