= Lista variegata =

Scientific classification
- Kingdom: Animalia
- Phylum: Arthropoda
- Class: Insecta
- Order: Lepidoptera
- Family: Pyralidae
- Genus: Lista
- Species: L. variegata

Binomial name
- Lista variegata (Moore, 1888)

Synonyms
- Scopocera variegata Moore, 1888

Species of moth

Lista variegata is a species of moth of the family Pyralidae. It was described by Frederic Moore in 1888, and is known from India (it was described from Darjeeling).
