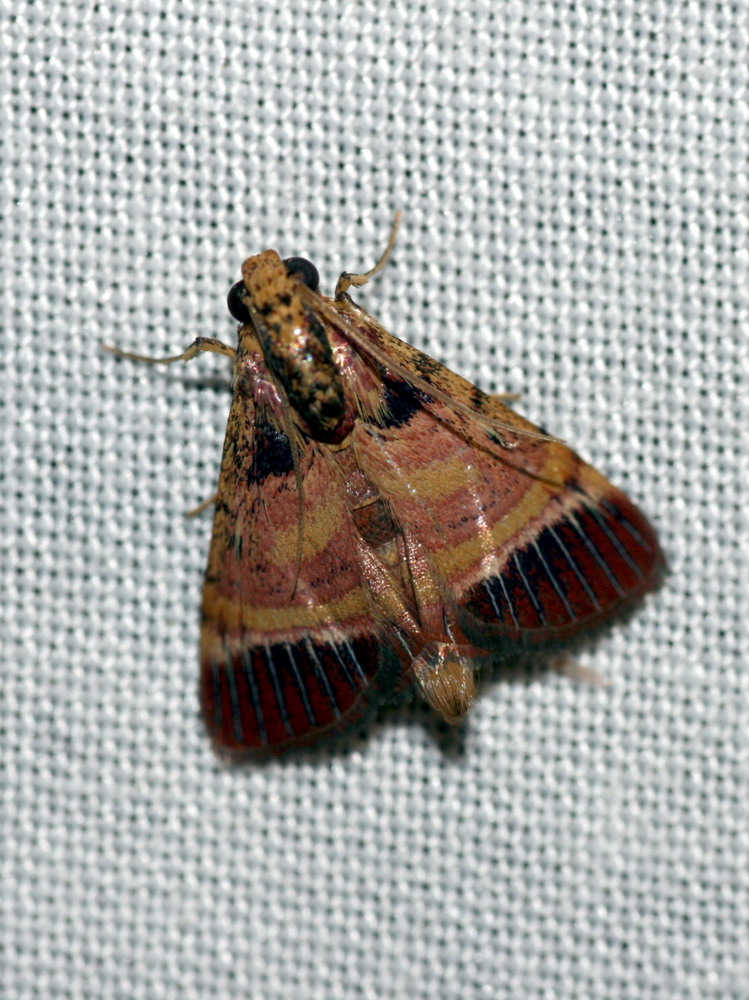
- Lista haraldusalis

Scientific classification
- Kingdom: Animalia
- Phylum: Arthropoda
- Class: Insecta
- Order: Lepidoptera
- Family: Pyralidae
- Subfamily: Epipaschiinae
- Genus: Lista; Walker, 1859

Synonyms
- Belonepholis Butler, 1889; Craneophora Christoph, 1881; Paracme Lederer, 1863

= Lista (moth) =

Genus of moths

Lista is a genus of snout moths. It was described by Francis Walker in 1859.

== Species ==
- Lista carniola
- Lista ficki (Christoph, 1881)
- Lista haraldusalis (Walker, 1859)
- Lista insulsalis (Lederer, 1863)
- Lista monticola Yamanaka, 2000
- Lista plinthochroa
- Lista sumatrana
- Lista variegata (Moore, 1888)
