= Yuanshan, Lianping County =

Yuanshan 元善镇
- Town
- Location in Guangdong
- Coordinates: 24.3671°N 114.4947°E
- Country: People's Republic of China
- Province: Guangdong
- Prefecture-level city: Heyuan
- County: Lianping County
- Time zone: UTC+8 (China Standard)

Yuanshan (Chinese: 元善; pinyin: Yuánshàn) is a town of Lianping County, Guangdong, China. As of 2018, it has 5 residential communities and 15 villages under its administration. Yuanshan is located 1,737 km South of the capital Beijing.
