= Chuang Chuang and Lin Hui =

Giant pandas

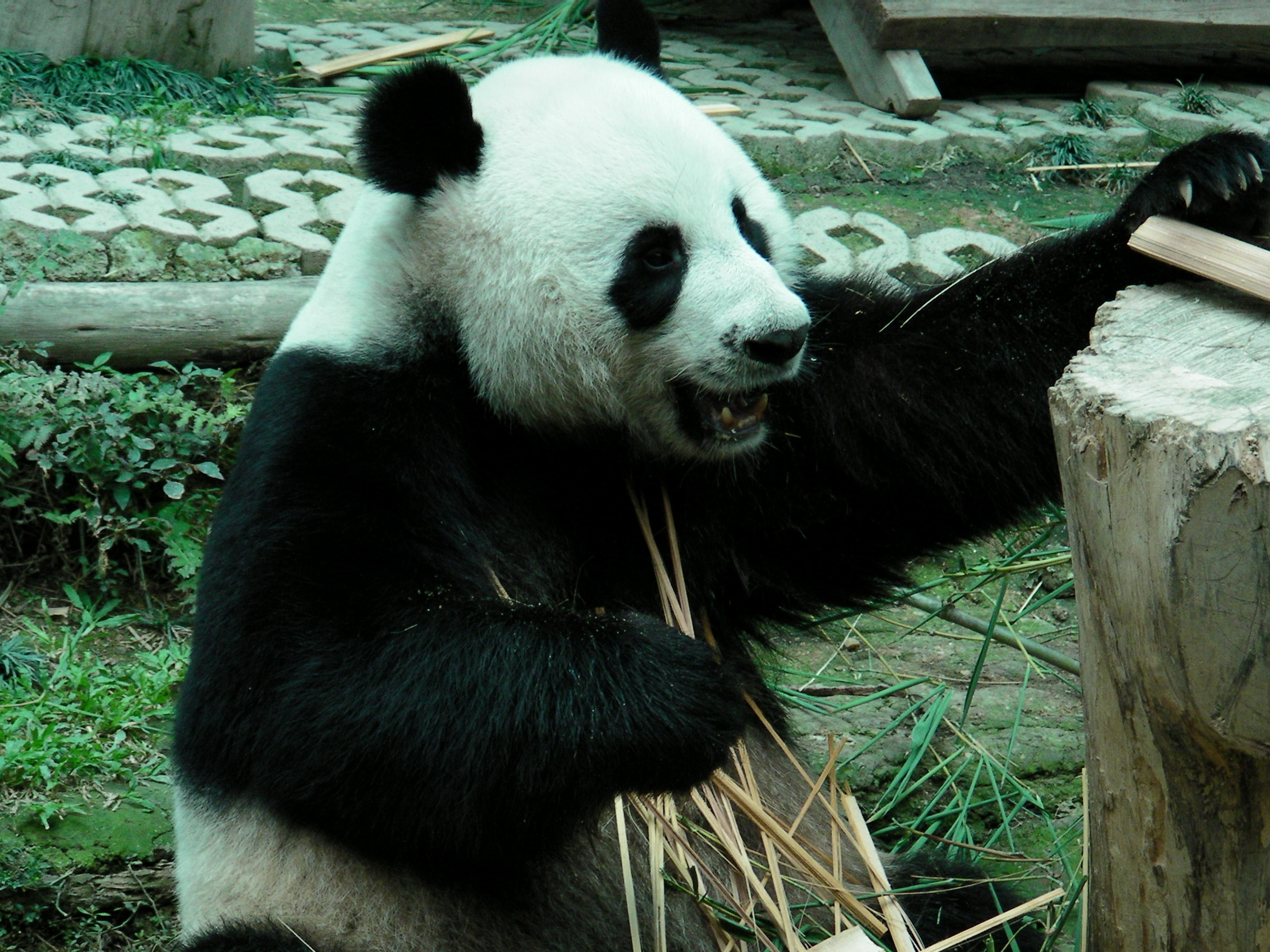
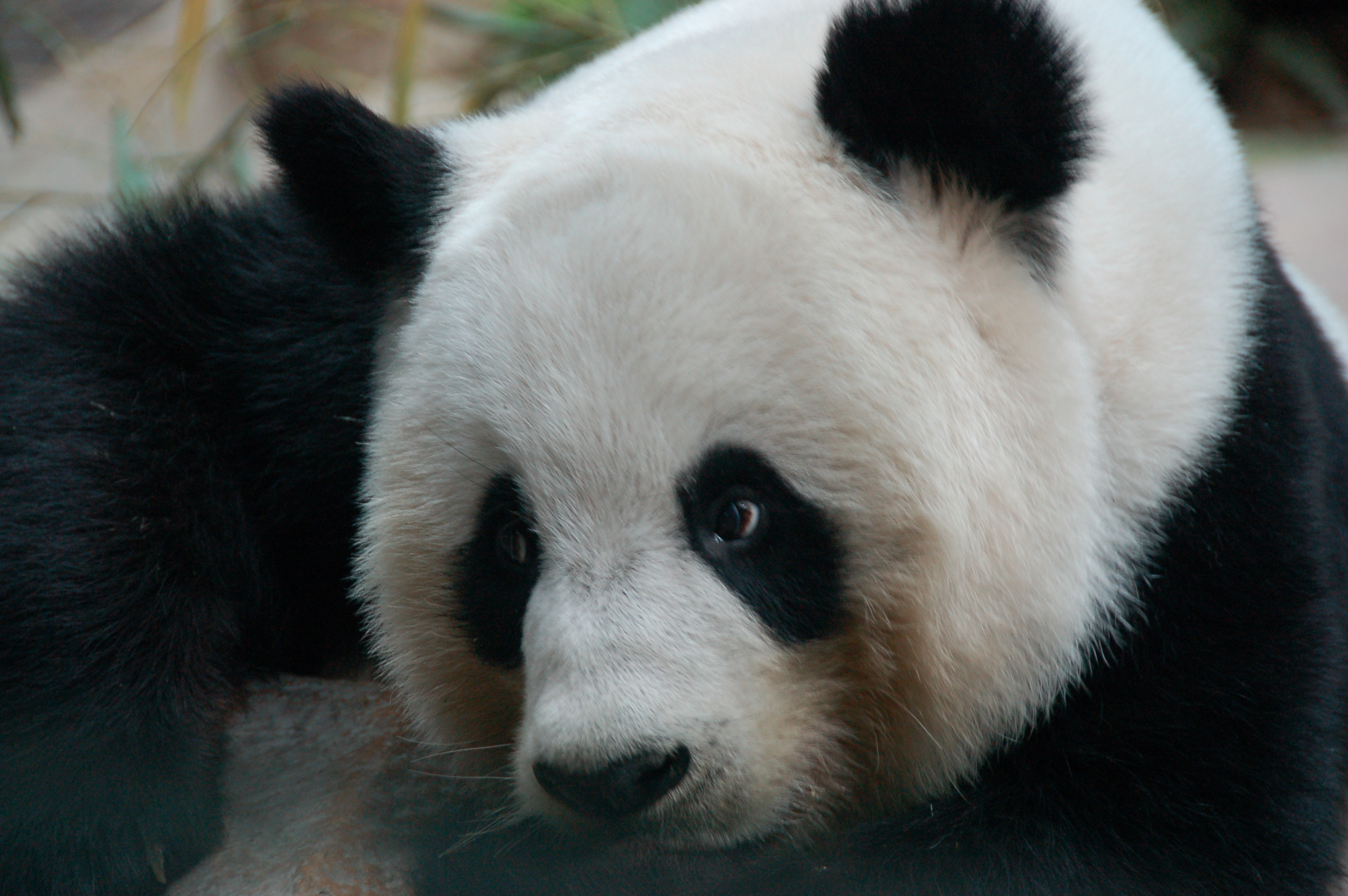
- Chuang Chuang in 2009 Lin Hui in 2007
- Species: Giant panda
- Offspring: Lin Bing
- Chuang Chuang
- Sex: Male
- Born: 6 August 2000; Sichuan, China
- Died: 16 September 2019 (aged 19); Chiang Mai, Thailand
- Parents: Xin Xing and Bai Xue
- Lin Hui
- Sex: Female
- Born: 28 September 2001; Sichuan, China
- Died: 19 April 2023 (aged 21); Chiang Mai, Thailand
- Parents: Pan Pan and Tang Tang

Chuang Chuang (simplified Chinese: 创创; traditional Chinese: 創創; pinyin: Chuàng chuàng; Thai: ช่วงช่วง; 6 August 2000 – 16 September 2019) and Lin Hui (Chinese: 林惠; pinyin: Lín huì; Thai: หลินฮุ่ย; 28 September 2001 – 19 April 2023) were two giant pandas from Sichuan, China, on loan to Chiang Mai Zoo in Chiang Mai, Thailand. After Chuang Chuang was put on a diet and shown panda mating videos, Lin Hui was unsuccessfully artificially inseminated in April 2007. The two pandas successfully bred artificially, and Lin Hui gave birth to Lin Bing, the first giant panda born in Thailand, on 27 May 2009.

== Life ==
Chuang Chuang, male, was born on 6 August 2000 to Xin Xing and Bai Xue. Lin Hui, female, was born on 28 September 2001 to Pan Pan and Tang Tang. They were born at the China Conservation and Research Center for Giant Pandas in Wolong, Sichuan province, China.

The pandas arrived at Chiang Mai Zoo on 12 October 2003 to begin a ten-year conservation program to breed giant pandas, but due to Chuang Chuang's obesity, he was put on a diet of bamboo leaves before he could mate with Lin Hui. Chuang Chuang was shown panda mating videos, but he was not sexually aroused, so Lin Hui was artificially inseminated in April 2007, but she was not impregnated.

=== Lin Bing ===
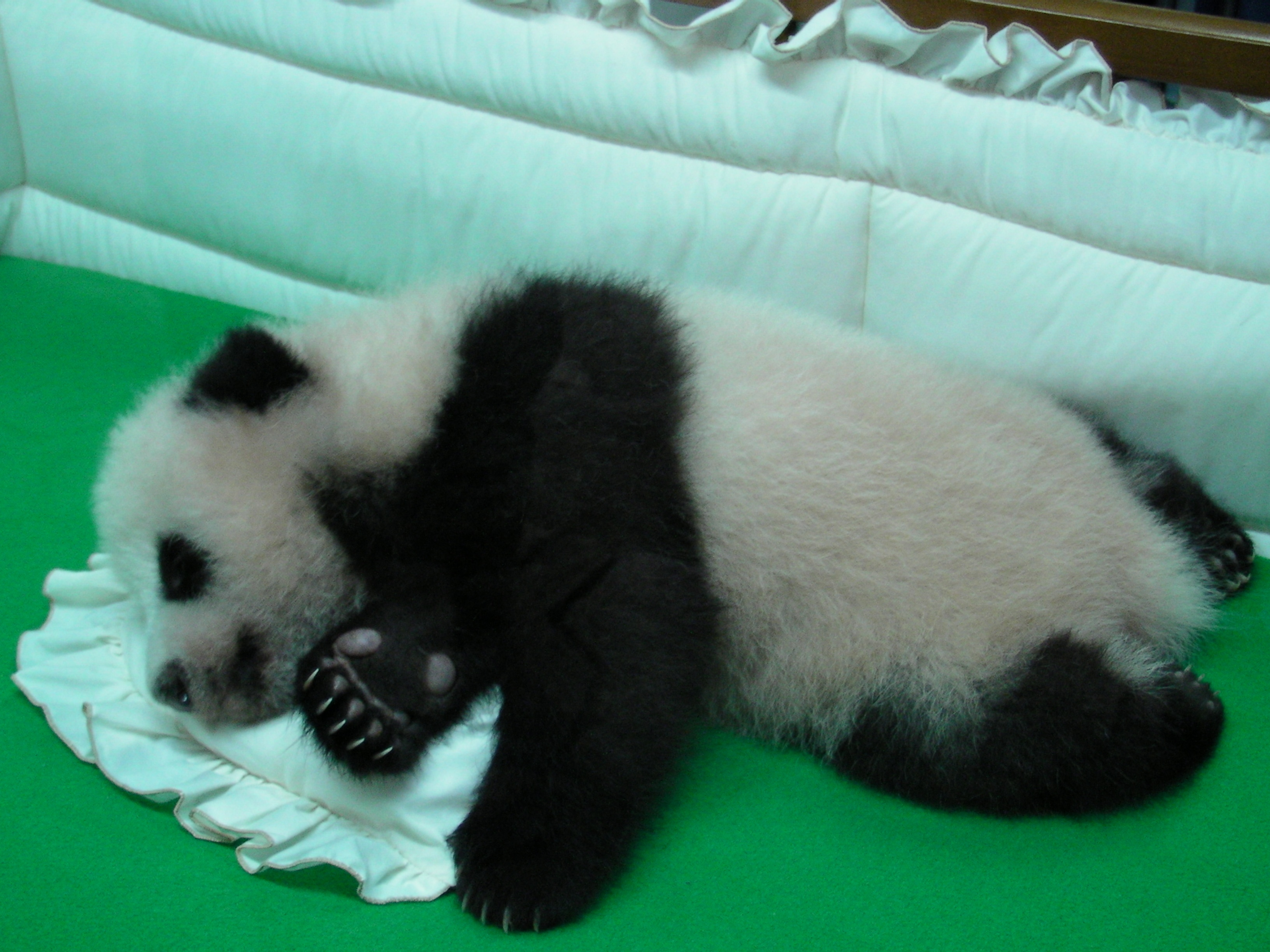
Lin Bing in August 2009

Chuang Chuang and Lin Hui successfully artificially bred and produced a female cub named Lin Bing, who was born on 27 May 2009 and also resided in Chiang Mai Zoo. Like her parents, Lin Bing is considered Chinese property. The first giant panda born in Thailand, Lin Bing's birth significantly boosted tourism at Chiang Mai Zoo. She returned to China in 2013, in accordance with panda diplomacy, the practice of sending giant pandas from mainland China to other countries as a tool of diplomacy and wildlife conservation. In China, Lin Bing mated with multiple pandas and, as of 2020, she has given birth to seven offspring.

== Death ==
Chuang Chuang died on 16 September 2019 at age 19, in his enclosure. Officials said that he collapsed shortly after standing up following a meal of bamboo leaves. Lin Hui died on 19 April 2023 at age 21 while under medical care. She had shown no signs of ill health before developing a nosebleed the previous day.

== See also ==
- List of individual giant pandas
- List of individual bears
