= Lista sumatrana =

Scientific classification
- Kingdom: Animalia
- Phylum: Arthropoda
- Class: Insecta
- Order: Lepidoptera
- Family: Pyralidae
- Genus: Lista
- Species: L. sumatrana

Binomial name
- Lista sumatrana (Hering, 1901)

Synonyms
- Craneophora sumatrana Hering, 1901

Species of moth

Lista sumatrana is a species of moth of the family Pyralidae. It was described by E. Hering in 1901 and is known from Sumatra, Indonesia, from which its species epithet is derived.
