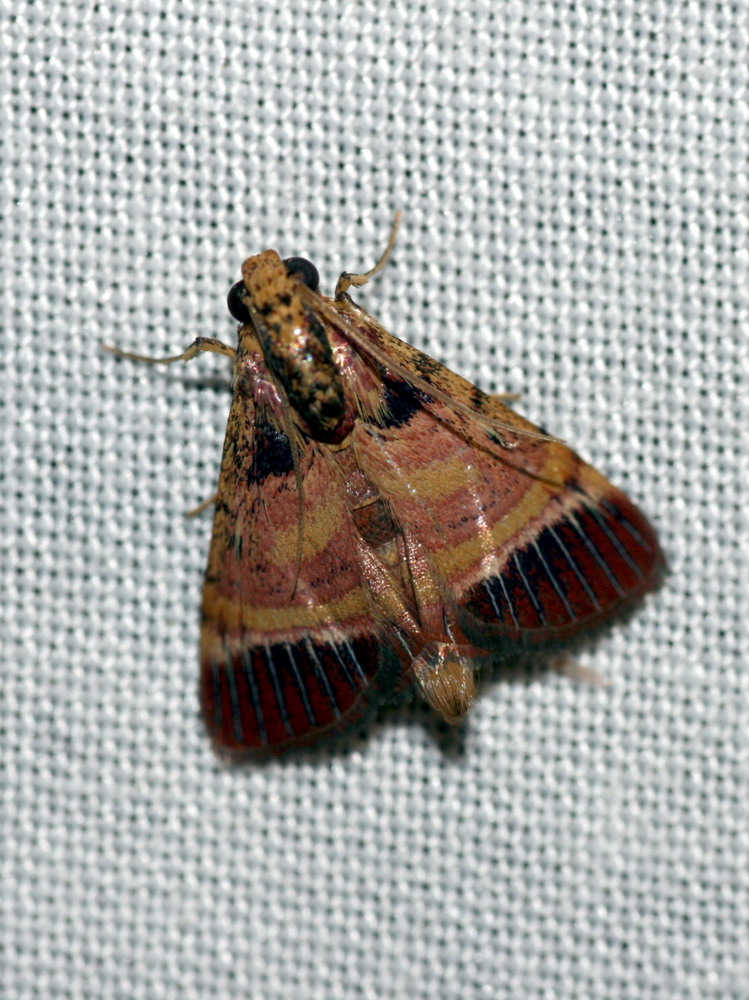

Scientific classification
- Kingdom: Animalia
- Phylum: Arthropoda
- Class: Insecta
- Order: Lepidoptera
- Family: Pyralidae
- Genus: Lista
- Species: L. haraldusalis

Binomial name
- Lista haraldusalis (Walker, 1859)

Synonyms
- Locastra haraldusalis Walker, 1859; Lista genisusalis Walker, 1859

= Lista haraldusalis =

Species of moth

Lista haraldusalis is a species of moth of the family Pyralidae. It was described by Francis Walker in 1859, and is known from Sarawak and Borneo in Malaysia.
