= Lista carniola =

Scientific classification
- Kingdom: Animalia
- Phylum: Arthropoda
- Class: Insecta
- Order: Lepidoptera
- Family: Pyralidae
- Genus: Lista
- Species: L. carniola

Binomial name
- Lista carniola (Hampson, 1916)

Synonyms
- Stericta carniola Hampson, 1916

Species of moth

Lista carniola is a species of moth of the family Pyralidae. It was described by George Hampson in 1916 and is known from Papua New Guinea (it was described from Dinawa).
