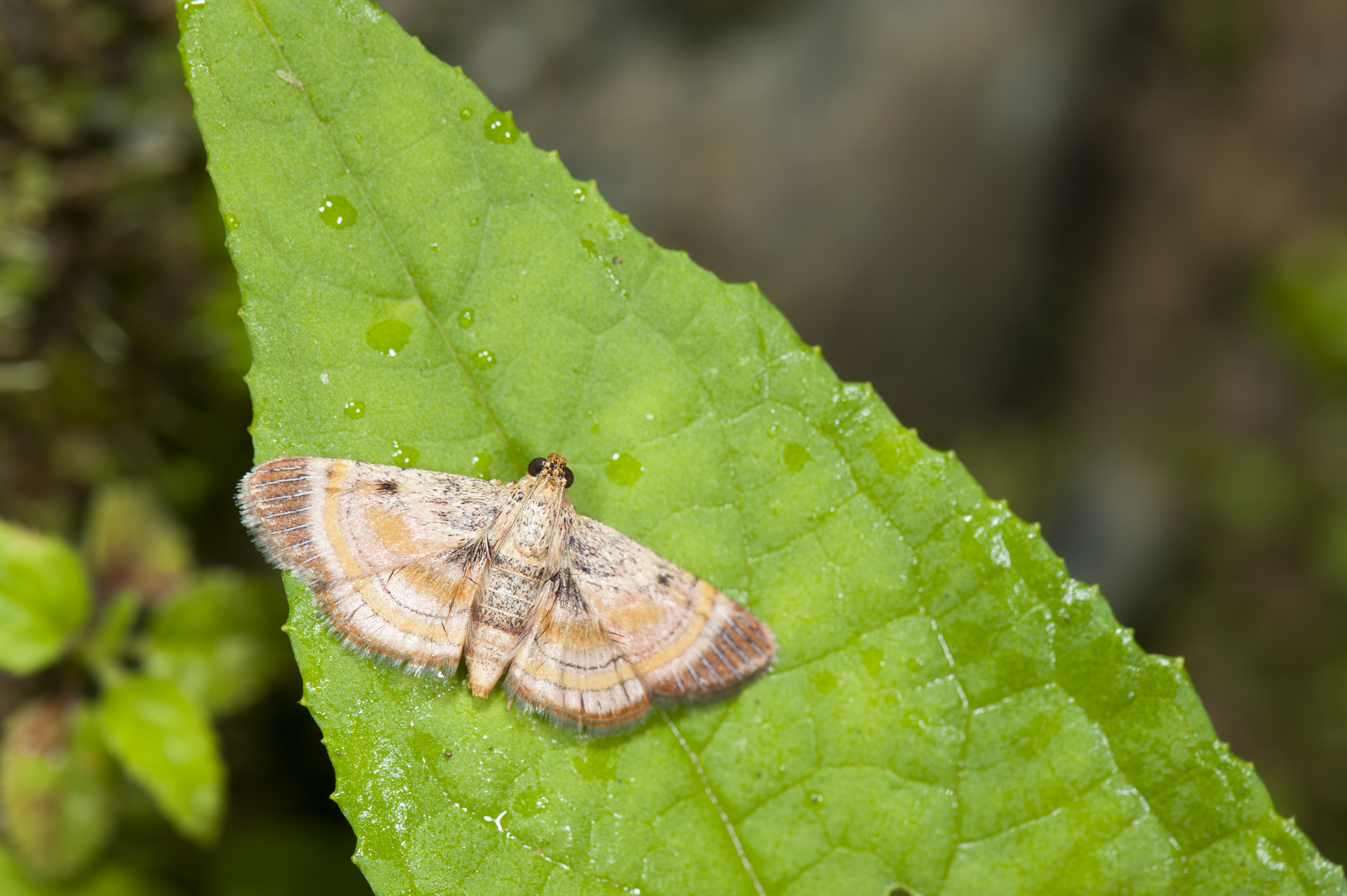

Scientific classification
- Kingdom: Animalia
- Phylum: Arthropoda
- Class: Insecta
- Order: Lepidoptera
- Family: Pyralidae
- Genus: Lista
- Species: L. ficki

Binomial name
- Lista ficki (Christoph, 1881)

Synonyms
- Craneophora ficki Christoph, 1881; Belonepholis striata Butler, 1889

= Lista ficki =

Species of moth

Lista ficki is a species of moth of the family Pyralidae. It is found in Japan and Taiwan.
