= Chiang Mai Zoo =

Zoo in Thailand

Chiang Mai Zoo & Aquarium
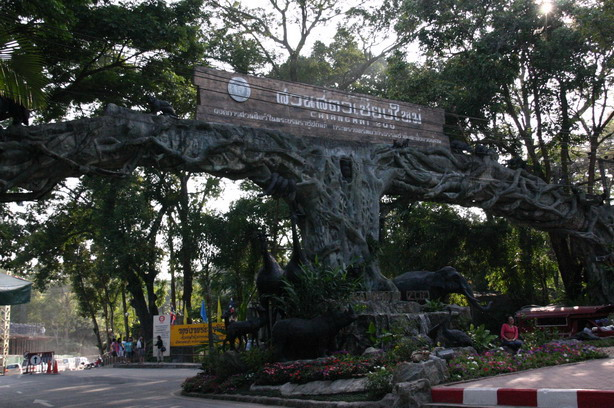
- Chiang Mai Zoo entrance
- Interactive map of Chiang Mai Zoo & Aquarium
- 18°48′32″N 98°56′49″E
- Date opened: 1957 (private zoo); 1977 (government zoo)
- Location: Mueang Chiang Mai, Chiang Mai, Thailand
- Land area: 200 acres (81 ha)
- No. of species: 400+
- Owner: Zoological Park Organization
- Website: www.chiangmaizoo.com

Chiang Mai Zoo and Aquarium (Thai: สวนสัตว์เชียงใหม่) is a 200-acre (81 ha) zoo on Huay Kaew Road in Chiang Mai Province, Thailand, just west of Chiang Mai University. It is the first commercial zoo in northern Thailand, established on 16 June 1977.

== History ==
In 1950 the US government sent military advisers to train tribal police along the border of Thailand. Among them was Harold Mason Young, son of American missionaries, who had been born in Burma. Young started helping injured animals, and his collection started getting visitors. The Chiang Mai provincial administration set aside 24 acres (9.7 ha) at the base of Doi Suthep, the mountain immediately adjacent to Chiang Mai, and the facility was opened to the public in 1957.

When Young died in 1974, the property was taken over by Chiang Mai Province. The zoo was expanded to its current 200 acres (81 ha) footprint, transferred to the Zoological Park Organization under Ministry of Natural Resources and Environment, and opened as the official zoo of Chiang Mai province in 1977.

== Exhibits ==
Chiang Mai Zoo is privately operated and includes a large variety of animals. In addition, it provides two large aquariums. On 28 October 2008, an aquatic tunnel with a length of 133 metres (436 ft)—the world's longest tunnel aquarium— was opened to the public.

== Animals ==
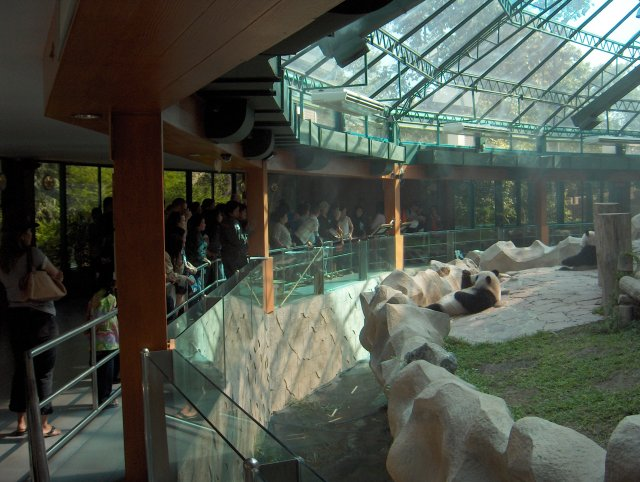
Panda enclosure at Chiang Mai Zoo

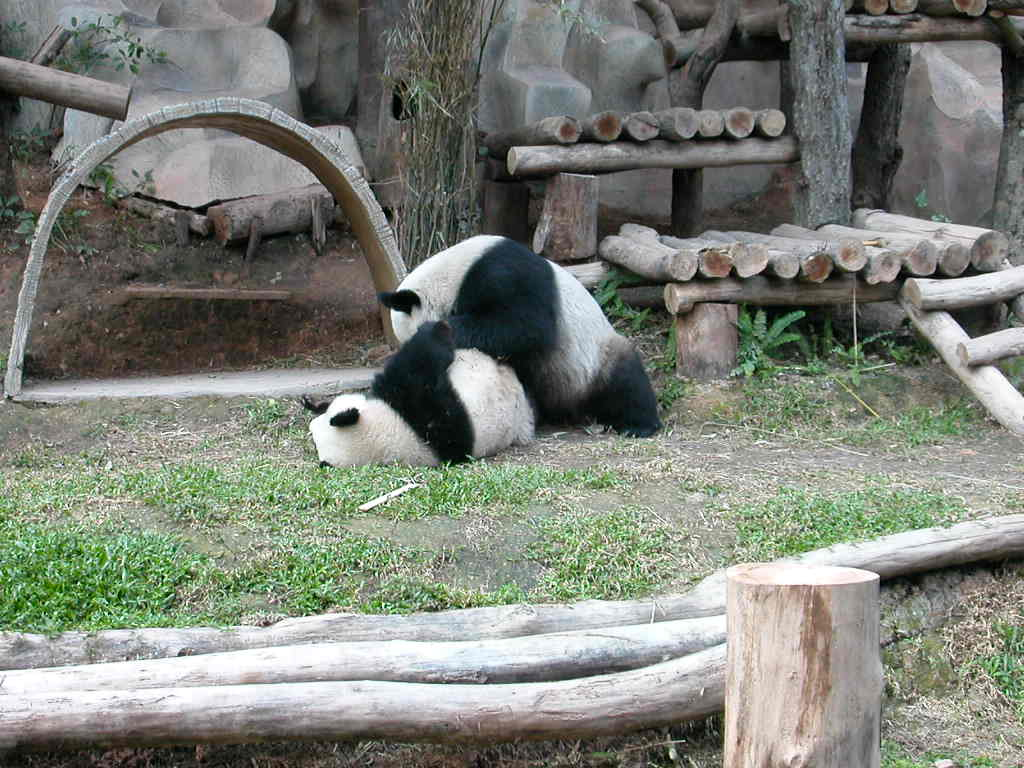
Giant pandas at the zoo

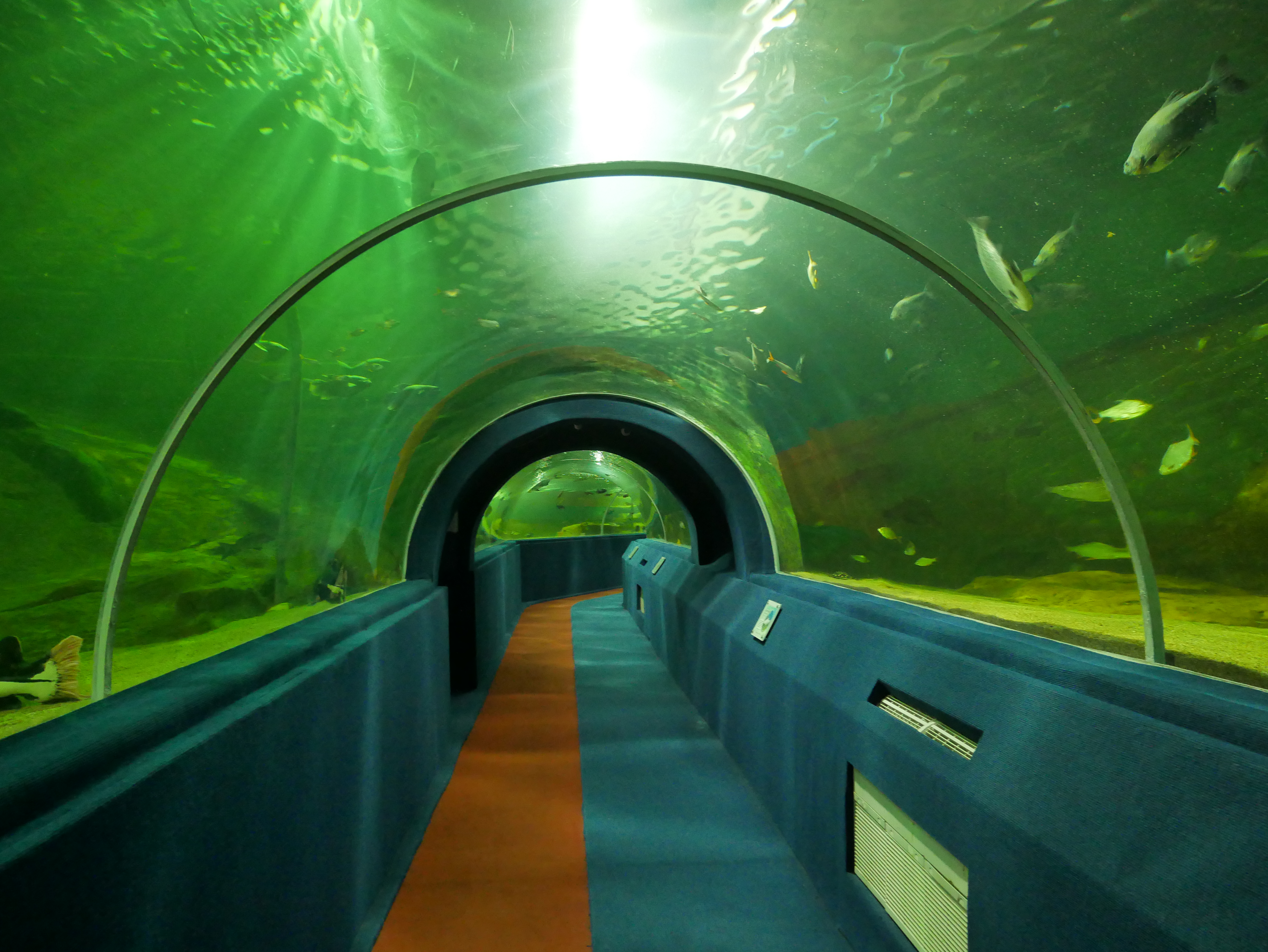
The aquarium at Chiang Mai Zoo

Overall, 400 animal species are represented in the zoo, including Humboldt penguins, Cape fur seals, koalas, Indian rhinoceroses, hippopotamuses, greater flamingos, gaur, red-shanked doucs, Bornean orangutans, African spurred tortoises, Asiatic black bears, Malayan sun bears, giant anteaters, Indochinese tigers, Barbary sheep, Malayan tapirs, and many reptile species. The zoo is also home to two Asian elephants and was previously home to three giant pandas.

Giant pandas Lin Hui and Chuang Chuang arrived at the zoo on 12 October 2003, and were on a ten-year loan from China as part of its so-called panda diplomacy. Their daughter, Lin Bing, was born at the zoo on 27 May 2009, and was returned to China when she was two years old. Lin Bing is one of just a few giant pandas born in captivity outside China. Chuang Chuang died on 16 September 2019 from heart failure and Lin Hui died on 19 April 2023 while under medical care.

The aquarium houses many species of fish and marine life, including crustaceans and Asian arowana. It also houses carnivorous fish, such as sharks.

== Transportation ==
The 2-kilometre (1.2 mi) Chiang Mai Zoo Monorail was opened in 2005. It ceased operations in 2014. The zoo also has trams that take visitors around the zoo for a charge.

== See also ==
- Chiang Mai Night Safari
