= Kai Feng =

Kai Feng may refer to:

- Kai Feng (politician) (1906–1955), Chinese politician
- Kai Z. Feng (born 1982), Chinese photographer
