= Lin Bing =

Female giant panda (born 2009)

Lin Bing Thai: หลินปิง Chinese: 林冰
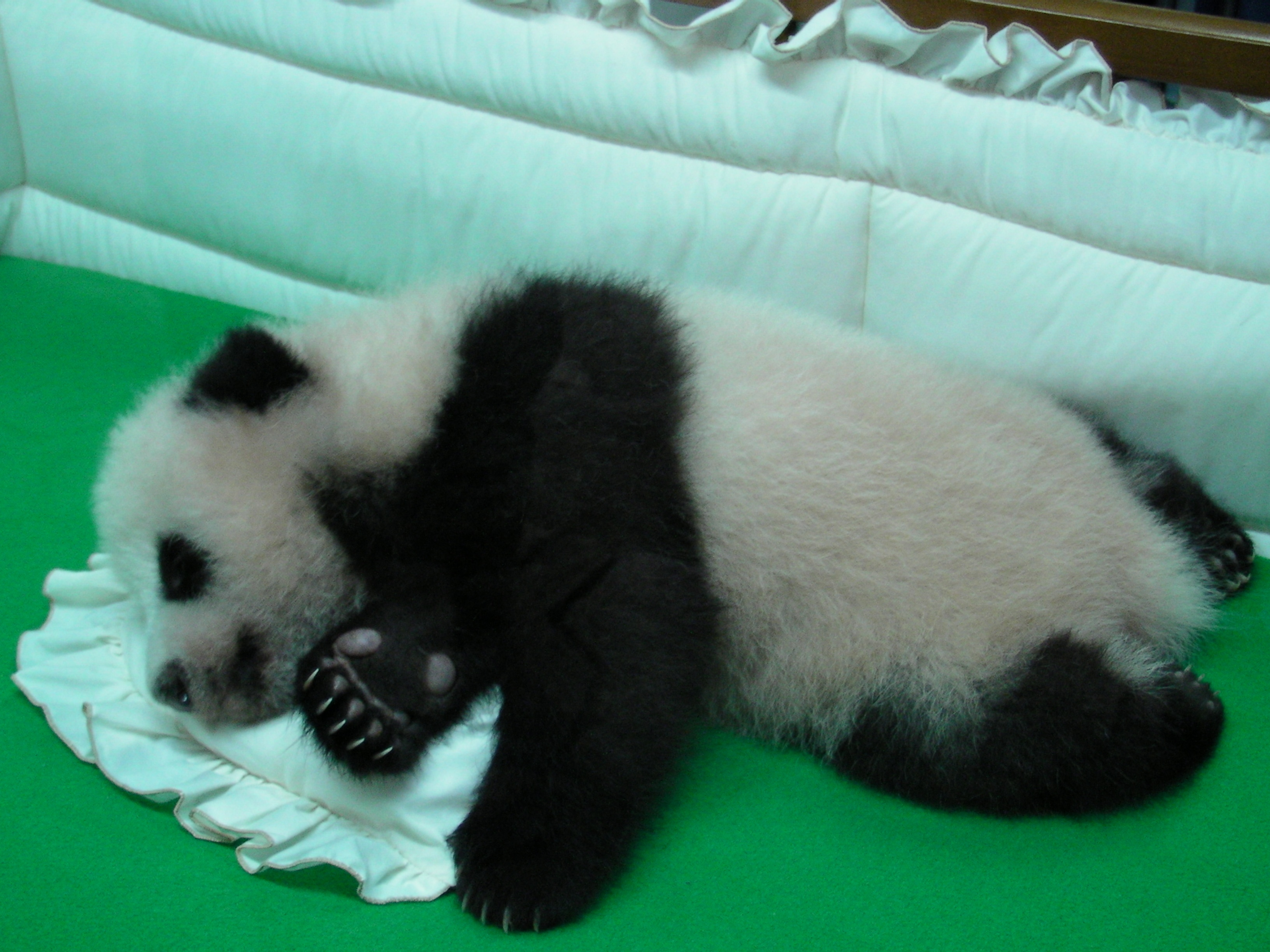
- Lin Bing in August 2009
- Species: Giant panda
- Sex: Female
- Born: 27 May 2009 (age 17); Chiang Mai Zoo, Chiang Mai, Thailand
- Known for: being the first giant panda born in Thailand
- Parent: Chuang Chuang and Lin Hui
- Offspring: 7
- Weight: 200 grams (at birth)

Lin Bing (Thai: หลินปิง, Chinese: 林冰, lit. 'Cold Forest'; born 27 May 2009), also known as Lin Ping, is a female giant panda born at Chiang Mai Zoo in Chiang Mai, Thailand. She was the first giant panda born in Thailand, conceived through gamete intrafallopian transfer to Chuang Chuang and Lin Hui after her father was shown panda mating videos, which proved ineffective.

Lin Bing's birth received significant media coverage in Thailand and improved tourism at Chiang Mai Zoo. Lin Bing was sent back to China in 2013, as she and her parents are considered Chinese property. She mated with numerous pandas in Sichuan, and, as of 2020, she has seven offspring.

== Life ==
Lin Bing was born on 27 May 2009 to Chuang Chuang (6 August 2000 – 16 September 2019) and Lin Hui (28 September 2001 – 19 April 2023) while her parents were on loan to Chiang Mai Zoo in Chiang Mai, Thailand, as part of a ten-year effort to build relations between China and Thailand, which started in 2003. Prior to her birth, her father was shown panda mating videos, but he was not sexually aroused, so her mother was artificially inseminated in April 2007. Her name, meaning "Cold Forest" in Chinese, was selected through a nationwide naming contest with over 21 million votes and 500 thousand entries. The first giant panda born in Thailand, Lin Bing's birth significantly boosted tourism at Chiang Mai Zoo, and she was featured on the front pages of Thai newspapers almost daily. A 4 by 5 feet (1.2 m × 1.5 m) cake was donated to the zoo a month after she was born, and a reality show titled Lin Bing: The Reality, which later became the Panda Channel, broadcast her and her parents' lives.

Like her parents, Lin Bing is considered the property of China. She was scheduled to be returned to China in 2013, in accordance with panda diplomacy, the practice of sending pandas from mainland China to other countries as a means of diplomacy and wildlife conservation. Her care was overseen by Thai veterinarians trained by Chinese panda specialists.

=== Mating and offspring ===
After Lin Bing was sent back to China in 2013, she was paired with four or five other pandas. She mated with Yuan Yuan and Wu Gang, giving birth to twin female cubs on 27 July 2015 at the Bifengxia Panda Base in Sichuan, China, after being pregnant for 117 days. However, one of the cubs died. Lin Bing was sent to the Wolong National Nature Reserve in 2017, where she gave birth to another pair of twin cubs, and had another two male cubs two years later. As of 2020, she has seven offspring, with her youngest cub, a male named Tutu, having been born that year.

== See also ==
- List of individual giant pandas
- List of individual bears
