= Kaifeng, Sichuan =

Kaifeng 开封镇
- Town
- Location in Sichuan
- Coordinates: 31°46′12″N 105°23′09″E
- Country: People's Republic of China
- Province: Sichuan
- Prefecture-level city: Guangyuan
- County: Jiange County
- Time zone: UTC+8 (China Standard)

Kaifeng (simplified Chinese: 开封; traditional Chinese: 開封; pinyin: Kāifēng) is a town in Jiange County, Sichuan province, China. As of 2020, it had three residential communities and 27 villages under its administration.

Neighborhoods

- Wenmiao Community (文庙社区)
- Guanghui Community (光辉社区)
- Heping Community (和平社区)

Villages

- Anshan Village (鞍山村)
- Longqiao Village (龙桥村)
- Tongba Village (同坝村)
- You'ai Village (友爱村)
- Baiyun Village (白云村)
- Guogou Village (郭沟村)
- Madeng Village (马灯村)
- Huilong Village (回龙村)
- Zuofang Village (作坊村)
- Shengli Village (胜利村)
- Zhuangzi Village (庄子村)
- Qingrong Village (青荣村)
- Yangling Village (杨岭村)
- Shixue Village (石靴村)
- Miaowan Village (庙湾村)
- Gaoya Village (高垭村)
- Baitu Village (白兔村)
- Quanshui Village (泉水村)
- Yingshui Village (迎水村)
- Malin Village (马林村)
- Tianzhu Village (天珠村)
- Siba Village (寺坝村)
- Zouma Village (走马村)
- Shiyin Village (石印村)
- Chaoyang Village (朝阳村)
- Shiyan Village (石堰村)
- Qingfeng Village (庆丰村)

== See also ==
- List of township-level divisions of Sichuan
