= Jiange County =

Jiange County 剑阁县
- County
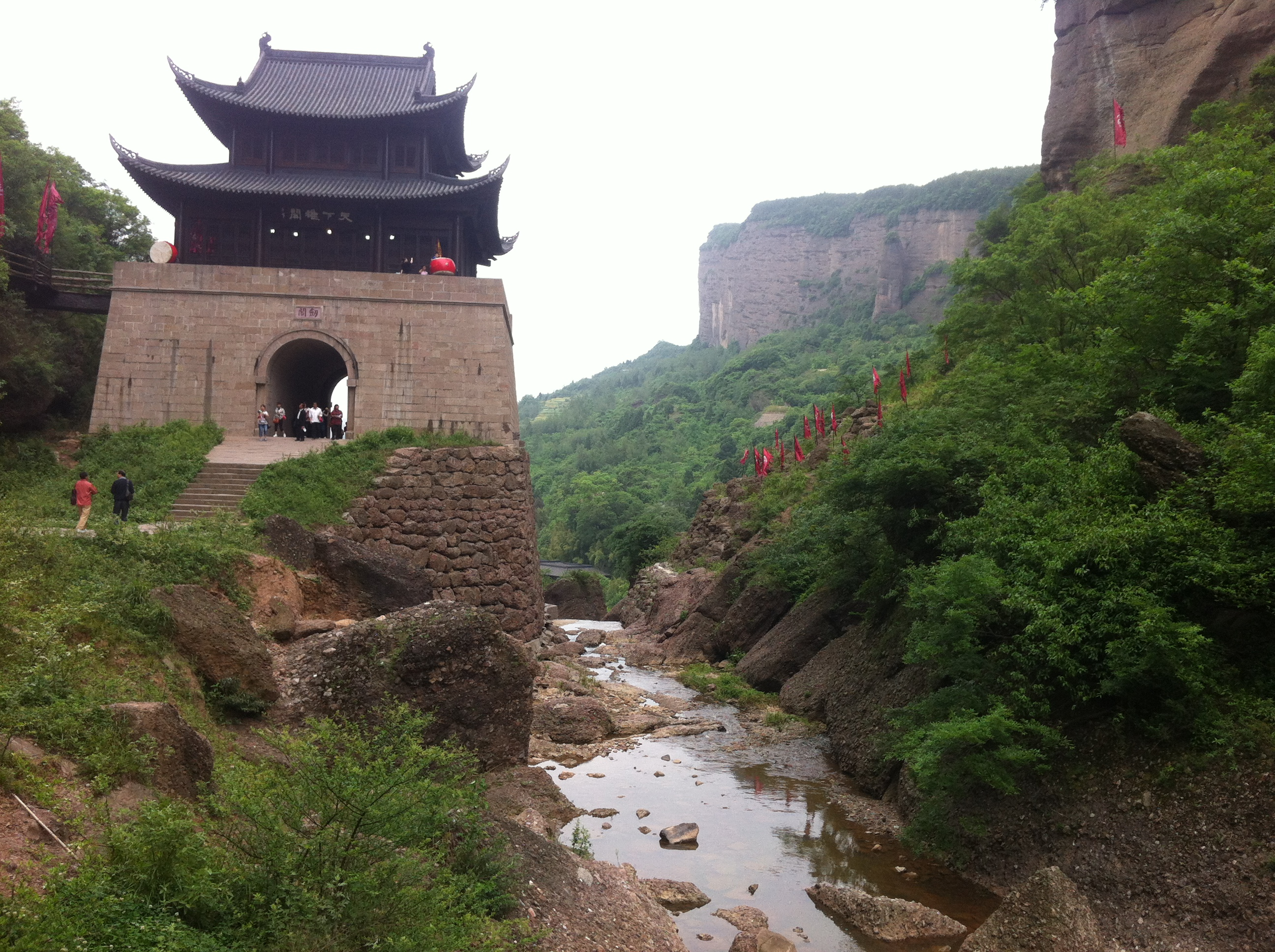
- Jianmen Pass gate

- Location of the seat in Sichuan
- Coordinates: 32.288°N 105.524°E
- Country: China
- Province: Sichuan
- Prefecture-level city: Guangyuan
- County seat: Pu'an

Area
  - Total: 3,204 km^{2} (1,237 sq mi)

Population (2010)
  - Total: 457,656
  - Density: 142.8/km^{2} (370.0/sq mi)
- Time zone: UTC+8 (China Standard)

Jiange County (simplified Chinese: 剑阁县; traditional Chinese: 劍閣縣; pinyin: Jiàngé Xiàn) is a county of Sichuan Province, China. It is under the administration of Guangyuan city. The history of Jiange County as a county division goes back around 1700 years. The county has historically been a junction between the north and south of Western China, through the Jianmen Pass. It is a popular tourist destination in Sichuan.

== Administrative divisions ==
The county government was formerly located in Pu'an town, and has been in Xiasi town since 2000. Jianmen administers 27 towns and 2 townships:

Towns

- Pu'an (普安镇)
- Longyuan (龙源镇)
- Yandian (盐店镇)
- Liugou (柳沟镇)
- Wulian (武连镇)
- Dongbao (东宝镇)
- Kaifeng (开封镇)
- Yuanshan (元山镇)
- Yansheng (演圣镇)
- Wanghe (王河镇)
- Songxing (公兴镇)
- Jinxian (金仙镇)
- Xiangcheng (香沉镇)
- Bailong (白龙镇)
- Heling (鹤龄镇)
- Yangcun (杨村镇)
- Yangling (羊岭镇)
- Jiangkou (江口镇)
- Muma (木马镇)
- Jianmenguan (剑门关镇)
- Hanyang (汉阳镇)
- Xiasi (下寺镇)
- Tushan (涂山镇)
- Dianzi (店子镇)
- Zhangwang (张王镇)
- Yaojia (姚家镇)
- Yixing (义兴镇)

Townships

- Xiuzhong (秀钟乡)
- Qiaodian (樵店乡)

== Culture ==
Jianmen's local specialties include Jianmen ham and Jianmenguan tofu. It is also known for the Jianmen cane. The local dialects, especially from Jinxian town, are notable for preserving the tones of old Sichuan dialects.

== Climate ==
Climate data for Jiange, elevation 545 m (1,788 ft), (1991–2020 normals, extremes 1981–present)
Month	Jan	Feb	Mar	Apr	May	Jun	Jul	Aug	Sep	Oct	Nov	Dec	Year
Record high °C (°F)	19.5 (67.1)	24.6 (76.3)	31.5 (88.7)	33.7 (92.7)	36.1 (97.0)	37.6 (99.7)	40.5 (104.9)	39.7 (103.5)	36.5 (97.7)	30.4 (86.7)	25.4 (77.7)	19.2 (66.6)	40.5 (104.9)
Mean daily maximum °C (°F)	9.6 (49.3)	12.3 (54.1)	17.2 (63.0)	23.1 (73.6)	27.0 (80.6)	29.6 (85.3)	31.1 (88.0)	30.9 (87.6)	25.7 (78.3)	20.8 (69.4)	16.0 (60.8)	10.8 (51.4)	21.2 (70.1)
Daily mean °C (°F)	4.9 (40.8)	7.5 (45.5)	11.7 (53.1)	16.7 (62.1)	20.7 (69.3)	23.8 (74.8)	25.6 (78.1)	25.1 (77.2)	20.9 (69.6)	16.3 (61.3)	11.2 (52.2)	6.2 (43.2)	15.9 (60.6)
Mean daily minimum °C (°F)	1.7 (35.1)	4.0 (39.2)	7.6 (45.7)	12.1 (53.8)	16.0 (60.8)	19.6 (67.3)	21.9 (71.4)	21.5 (70.7)	18.0 (64.4)	13.5 (56.3)	8.3 (46.9)	3.1 (37.6)	12.3 (54.1)
Record low °C (°F)	−5.7 (21.7)	−3.9 (25.0)	−1.3 (29.7)	1.6 (34.9)	7.4 (45.3)	11.3 (52.3)	16.7 (62.1)	14.4 (57.9)	10.5 (50.9)	3.2 (37.8)	−1.0 (30.2)	−7.1 (19.2)	−7.1 (19.2)
Average precipitation mm (inches)	8.7 (0.34)	13.2 (0.52)	25.8 (1.02)	51.2 (2.02)	100.8 (3.97)	150.9 (5.94)	310.7 (12.23)	171.0 (6.73)	166.2 (6.54)	62.6 (2.46)	19.4 (0.76)	6.7 (0.26)	1,087.2 (42.79)
Average precipitation days (≥ 0.1 mm)	5.6	6.3	8.6	10.6	12.1	12.9	15.4	13.1	14.4	12.7	7.5	5.1	124.3
Average snowy days	2.2	1.1	0.1	0	0	0	0	0	0	0	0.1	0.6	4.1
Average relative humidity (%)	73	71	70	70	69	75	80	80	83	82	79	75	76
Mean monthly sunshine hours	72.5	69.4	104.3	141.1	161.7	150.5	162.7	168.6	92.6	81.4	72.3	73.8	1,350.9
Percentage possible sunshine	23	22	28	36	38	35	38	41	25	23	23	24	30
Source: China Meteorological Administrationall-time extreme temperature (July 2026 and August 2022

== Transport ==
- G5 Beijing–Kunming Expressway
- China National Highway 108
- Xi'an–Chengdu high-speed railway
- Baoji–Chengdu railway
