= Yuanshan, Jiange County =

Yuanshan 元山镇
- Town
- Location in Sichuan
- Coordinates: 31°35′12″N 105°25′49″E
- Country: People's Republic of China
- Province: Sichuan
- Prefecture-level city: Guangyuan
- County: Jiange County
- Time zone: UTC+8 (China Standard)

Yuanshan (Chinese: 元山; pinyin: Yuánshān) is a town of Jiange County, Sichuan, China. As of 2018, it has one residential community and 21 villages under its administration.
