= Siege of Kaifeng =

Siege of Kaifeng may refer to:

- Jingkang Incident in 1127, a conflict in the Jin–Song wars between the Southern Song and the Jin dynasty
- Siege of Kaifeng (1232) in 1232, a major battle in the Mongol-Jin War
