= Lianping County =

Lianping 连平县
- County
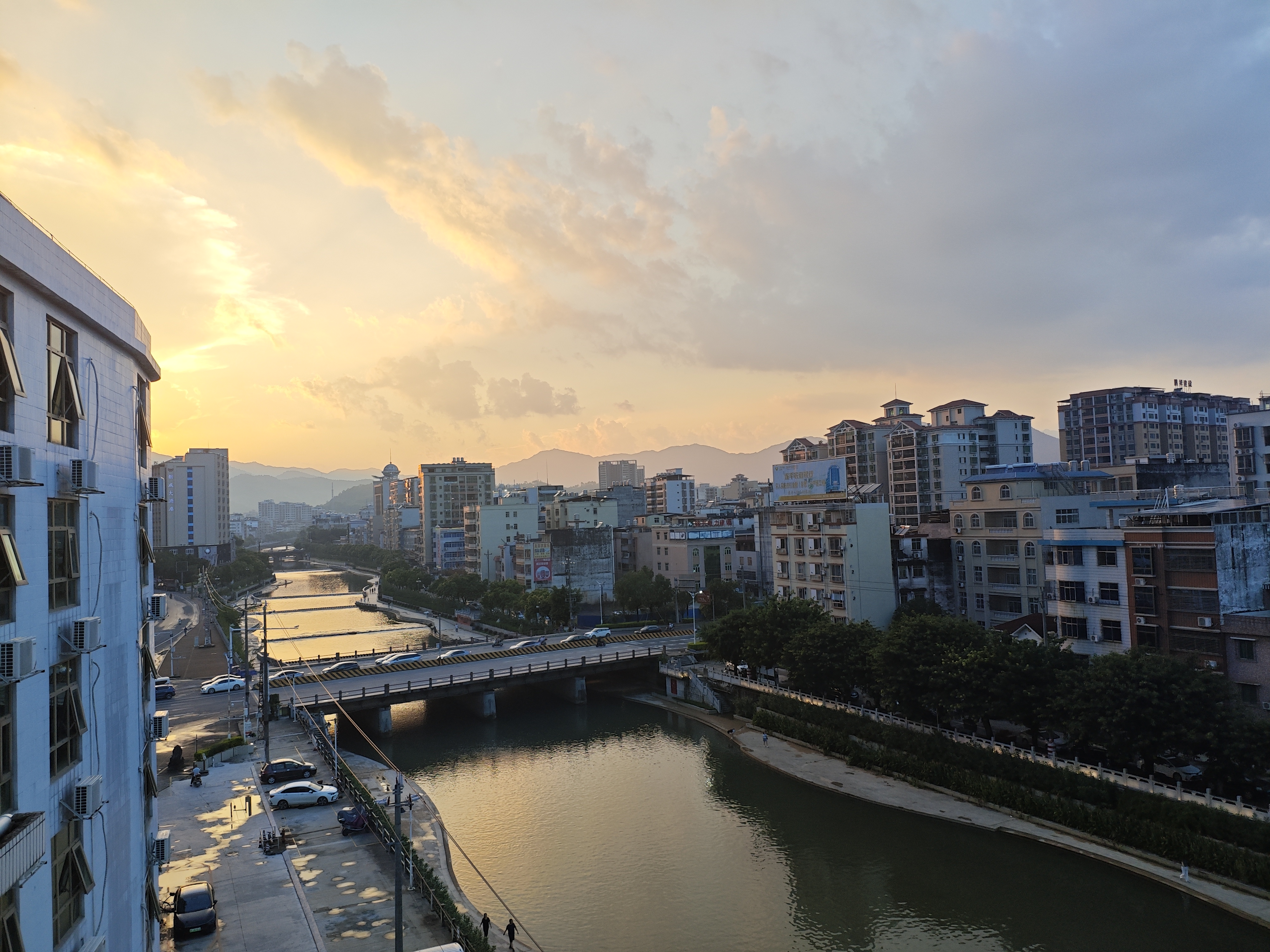
- Jinhu Bridge

- Location in Guangdong
- Coordinates: 24°30′N 114°29′E
- Country: People's Republic of China
- Province: Guangdong
- Prefecture-level city: Heyuan

Area
  - Total: 2,365 km^{2} (913 sq mi)

Population (2020 census)
  - Total: 285,224
  - Density: 120.6/km^{2} (312.4/sq mi)
- Time zone: UTC+8 (China Standard)

Lianping County (postal: Linping; simplified Chinese: 连平县; traditional Chinese: 連平縣; pinyin: Liánpíng Xiàn) is a county of northeastern Guangdong province, China, bordering Jiangxi to the north. It is under the administration of Heyuan City.

== Climate ==
Climate data for Lianping, elevation 284 m (932 ft), (1991–2020 normals, extremes 1963–2010)
Month	Jan	Feb	Mar	Apr	May	Jun	Jul	Aug	Sep	Oct	Nov	Dec	Year
Record high °C (°F)	28.4 (83.1)	30.7 (87.3)	32.4 (90.3)	33.7 (92.7)	35.6 (96.1)	38.3 (100.9)	38.7 (101.7)	38.4 (101.1)	37.4 (99.3)	36.2 (97.2)	34.3 (93.7)	28.6 (83.5)	38.7 (101.7)
Mean daily maximum °C (°F)	16.8 (62.2)	18.5 (65.3)	20.8 (69.4)	25.5 (77.9)	29.0 (84.2)	31.4 (88.5)	33.5 (92.3)	33.3 (91.9)	31.4 (88.5)	28.2 (82.8)	23.9 (75.0)	18.8 (65.8)	25.9 (78.6)
Daily mean °C (°F)	11.2 (52.2)	13.3 (55.9)	16.2 (61.2)	20.9 (69.6)	24.4 (75.9)	26.7 (80.1)	28.0 (82.4)	27.6 (81.7)	25.9 (78.6)	22.3 (72.1)	17.7 (63.9)	12.7 (54.9)	20.6 (69.0)
Mean daily minimum °C (°F)	7.7 (45.9)	9.9 (49.8)	13.1 (55.6)	17.7 (63.9)	21.3 (70.3)	23.7 (74.7)	24.4 (75.9)	24.2 (75.6)	22.4 (72.3)	18.3 (64.9)	13.7 (56.7)	8.8 (47.8)	17.1 (62.8)
Record low °C (°F)	−5.4 (22.3)	−0.6 (30.9)	−0.9 (30.4)	6.6 (43.9)	11.1 (52.0)	15.2 (59.4)	19.4 (66.9)	20.0 (68.0)	14.1 (57.4)	7.1 (44.8)	1.1 (34.0)	−2.8 (27.0)	−5.4 (22.3)
Average precipitation mm (inches)	64.0 (2.52)	76.4 (3.01)	168.3 (6.63)	225.6 (8.88)	242.3 (9.54)	313.9 (12.36)	200.4 (7.89)	204.2 (8.04)	129.1 (5.08)	30.4 (1.20)	47.2 (1.86)	46.8 (1.84)	1,748.6 (68.85)
Average precipitation days (≥ 0.1 mm)	8.6	11.1	17.8	17.3	19.2	20.0	16.6	17.4	11.6	5.5	6.7	6.8	158.6
Average snowy days	0.3	0.1	0	0	0	0	0	0	0	0	0	0.1	0.5
Average relative humidity (%)	71	74	79	80	80	81	78	79	76	69	69	67	75
Mean monthly sunshine hours	106.2	82.9	69.9	79.4	99.2	117.7	187.5	176.9	163.6	173.7	152.7	140.8	1,550.5
Percentage possible sunshine	32	26	19	21	24	29	45	44	45	49	47	43	35
Source: China Meteorological Administrationall-time record low
