= National Museum of Nature and Science =

Museum in Tokyo, Japan

- 国立科学博物館

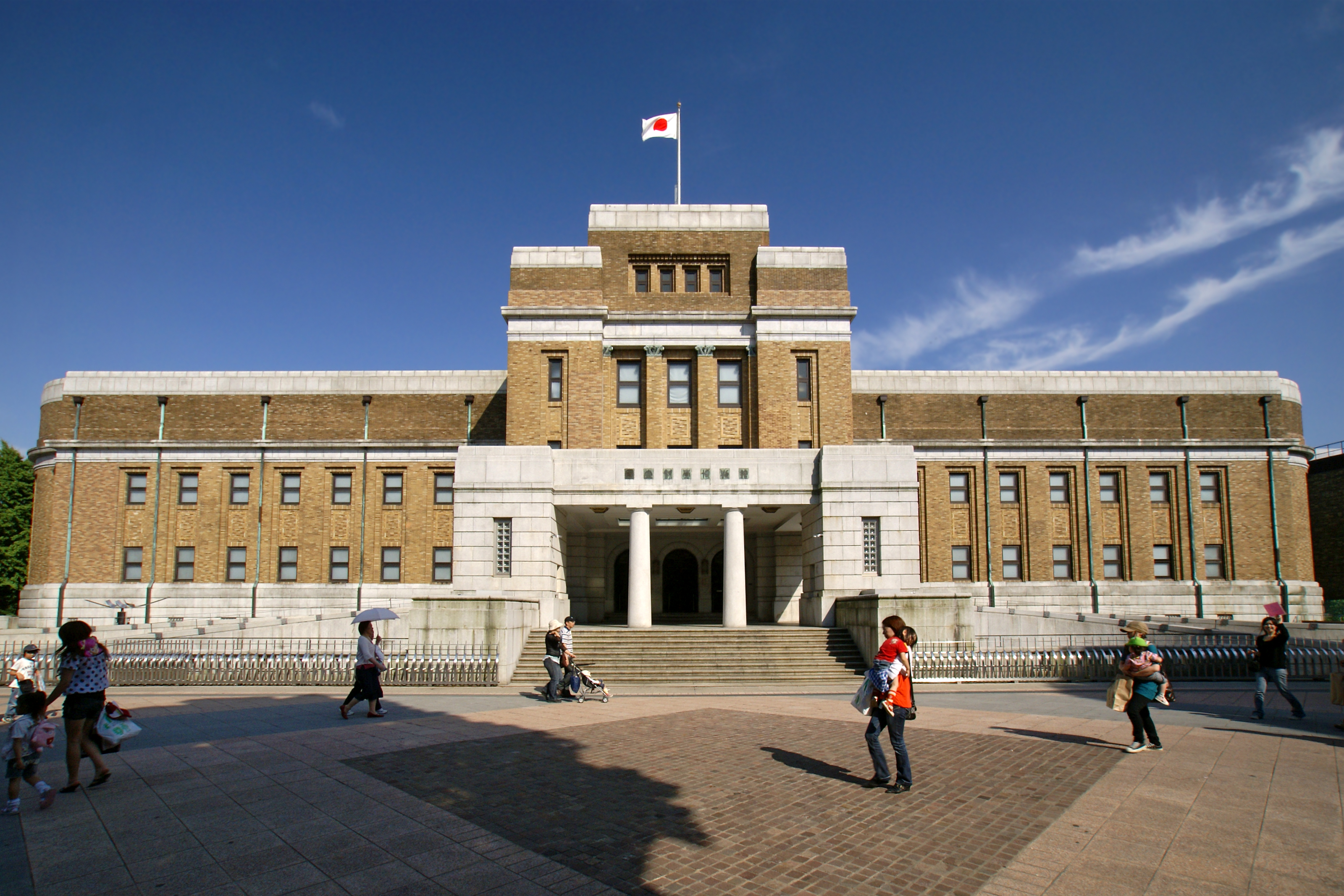
- National Museum of Nature and Science, Tokyo
- Established: 1877
- Location: Ueno Park, Ueno, Tokyo
- Coordinates: 35°42′57″N 139°46′35″E
- Visitors: 2,884,518 (2017)
- Website: www.kahaku.go.jp

The National Museum of Nature and Science (国立科学博物館, Kokuritsu Kagaku Hakubutsukan) is in the northeast corner of Ueno Park in Tokyo. The museum has exhibitions on pre-Meiji science in Japan. It is the venue of the taxidermied bodies of the legendary dogs Hachikō and Taro and Jiro. A life-size blue whale model and a steam locomotive are also on display outside.

== History ==
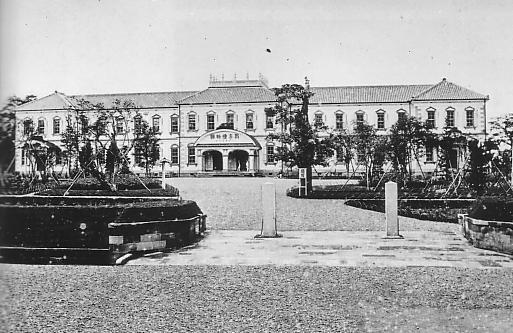
Tokyo Educational Museum in Meiji era (1868–1912)

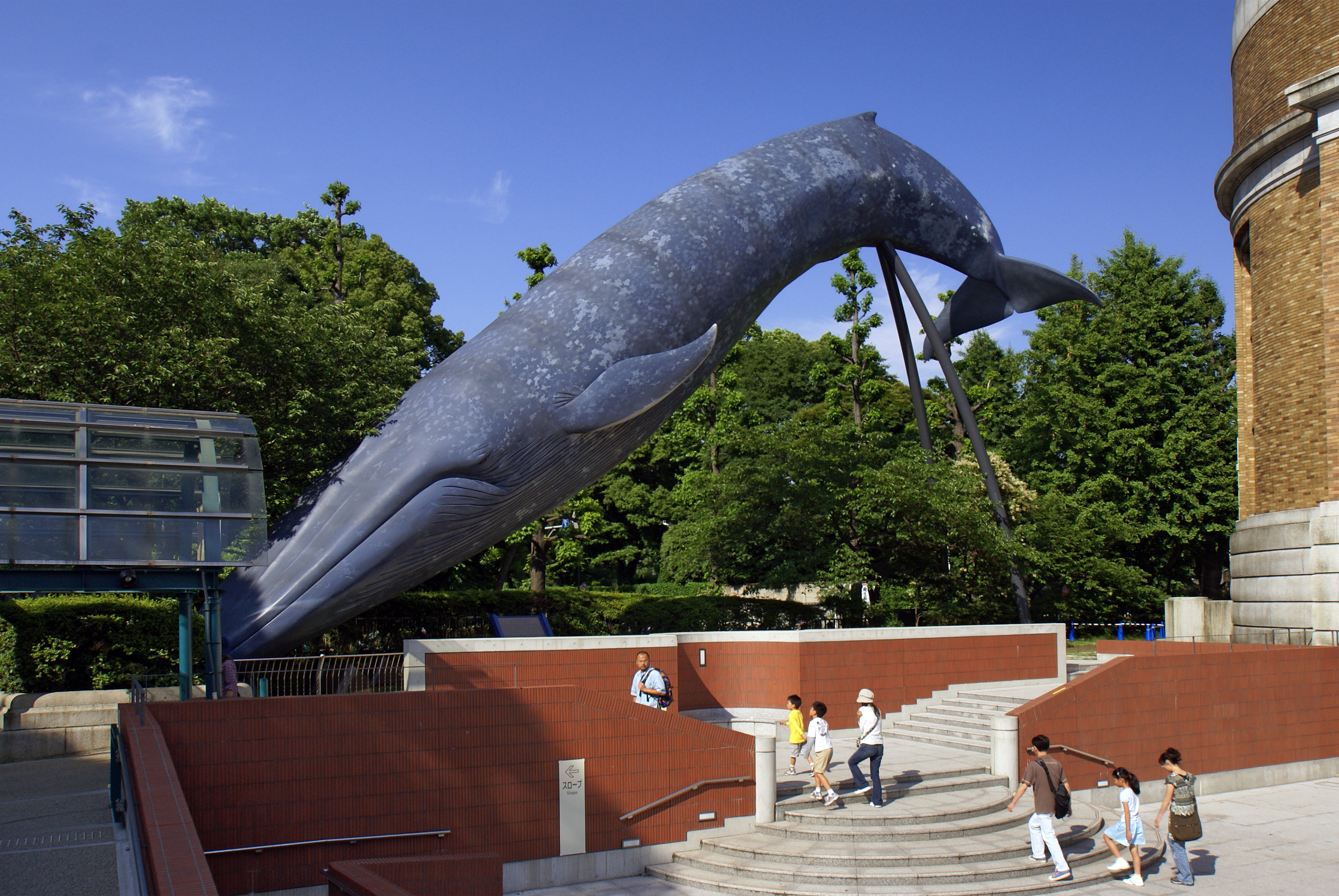
Blue whale life-size model

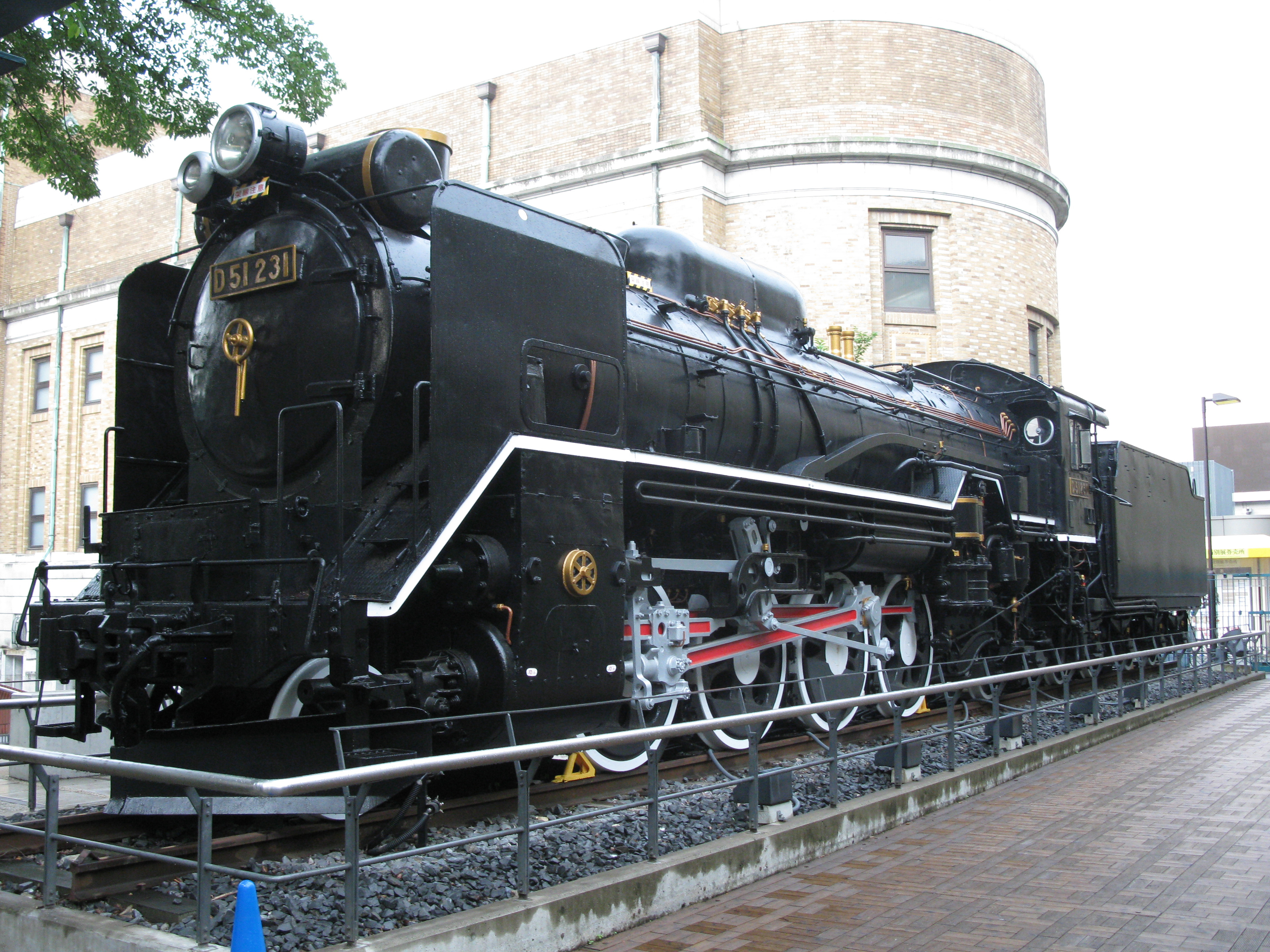
Steam locomotive in front of the National Museum of Nature and Science

Opened in 1877, it has had several names, including Ministry of Education Museum, Tokyo Museum, Tokyo Science Museum, the National Science Museum of Japan, and the National Museum of Nature and Science as of 2007. It was renovated in the 1990s and 2000s, and offers a wide variety of natural history exhibitions and interactive scientific experiences.

It was completed as the main building of the Tokyo Science Museum in September 1931 as part of the reconstruction project after the Great Kanto Earthquake in Neo-Renaissance style. Designed by Kenzo Akitani, an engineer of the Ministry of Education, Culture, Sports, Science and Technology, Building Division. The building is the most visited museum in Japan, and looks like an airplane when viewed from above. In addition to the exhibition hall, it has facilities such as a dome for astronomical observation and an auditorium.

It is designed to withstand earthquakes of the Great Kanto Earthquake class, and it is said that there is no problem in light of the current Building Standards Act standards.

In 2021, the museum organized the Pokémon Fossil Museum, a travelling exhibition based on the Pokémon franchise, in collaboration with The Pokémon Company. The exhibition opened at the Mikasa City Museum in Mikasa, Hokkaido, Japan, on 4 July 2021, and remained there until 20 September. It has since been hosted by several other museums across Japan, including the National Museum of Nature and Science, which hosted it from 15 March to 19 June 2022. A virtual tour of the exhibit as it appeared in the museum was also made available online.

== Materials in the collection ==
=== Number of materials ===
5,004,294 items (as of FY2022). Of these, approximately 14,000 are on permanent display. Others are stored and researched in the Tsukuba area.

- Animal Research Department – 2,346,747 items
- Department of Botany – 2,110,147 items
- Geology Department – 353,270 items
- Humanity Research Department – 163,315 items
- Department of Science and Engineering – 38,815 items

About 100,000 items are newly collected each year.

=== Designated Cultural Properties ===
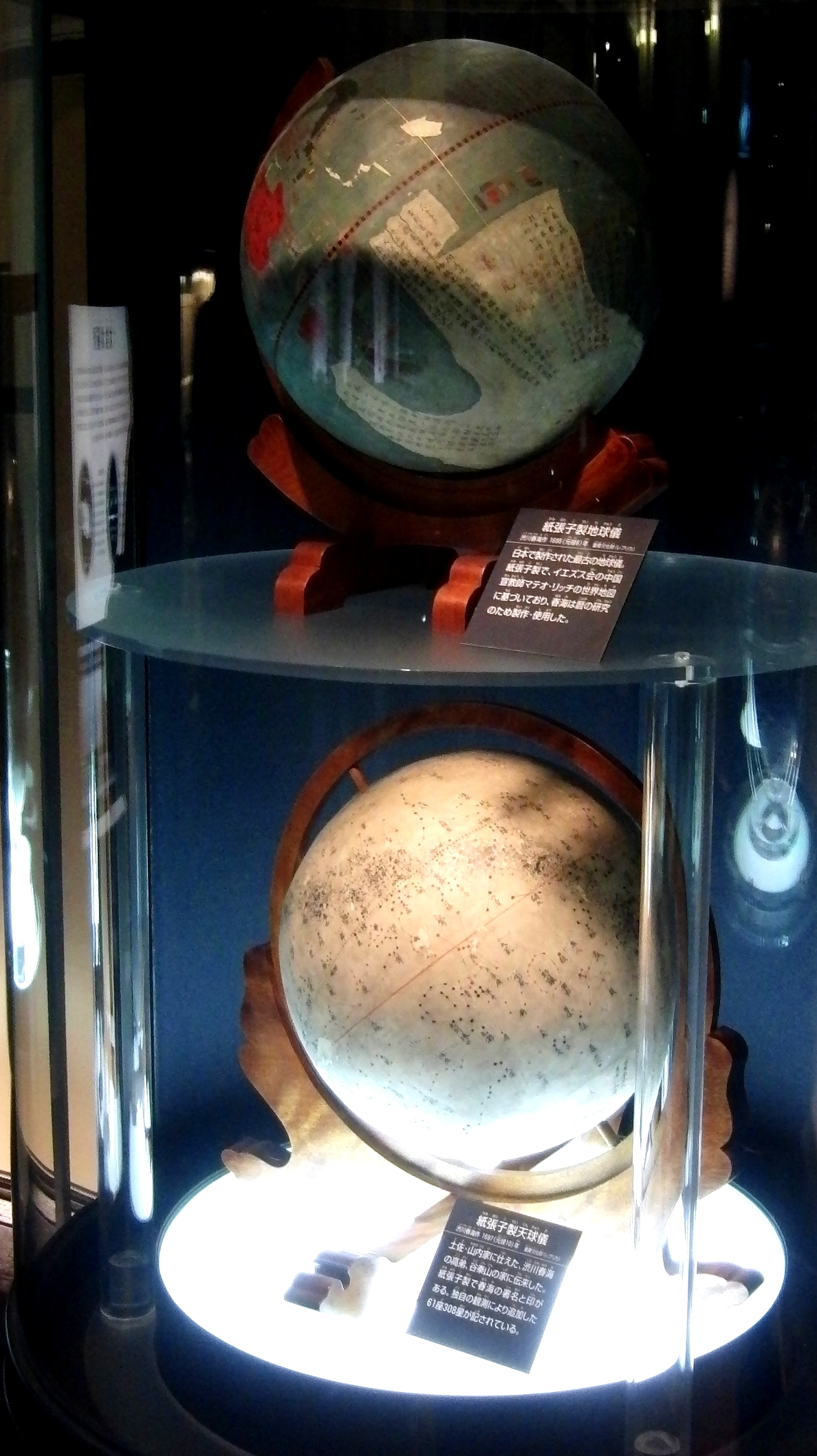
Globe (top) and Celestial Globe (bottom) by Harumi Shibukawa

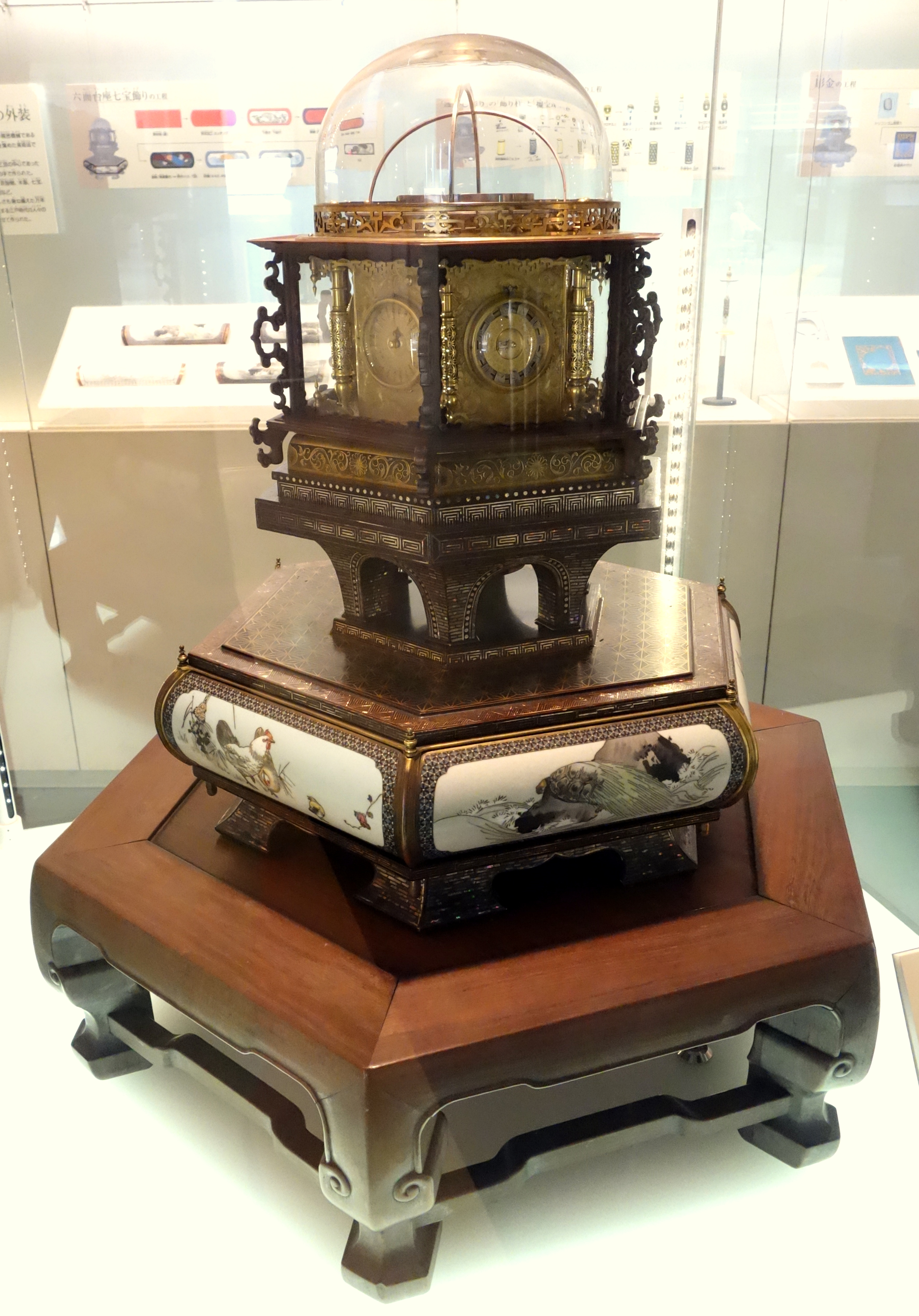
Perpetual Myriad year clock

The following items in the collection are designated as national Important Cultural Properties.

- Celestial Globe and Globe by Shibukawa Shunkai (with two old pedestal boards)

Myriad year clock made in 1695, celestial globe made in 1697.

- Myriad year clock by Hisashige Tanaka: Toshiba

Made in 1851. Owned by Toshiba. In 1931, it was deposited at the Tokyo Science Museum (predecessor of the National Museum of Nature and Science). Exhibited on the 2nd floor of the Earth Pavilion.

- Astronomical telescope (8-inch flexure equatorial mount) made in UK.

Made by Troughton & Sims. The first full-scale and largest telescope imported to Japan. Used by the NAOJ until 1967.

- Milne horizontal pendulum seismograph (Appendix: Earthquake Record Vol. 41)

The oldest existing seismograph in Japan. It was installed in 1899 on the Tokyo Imperial University campus. Invented by Milne, a mining engineer and seismologist from England.

- Sogeograph (tin foil gramophone), made in England (attached: wooden box)

The first phonograph introduced to Japan. On 16 November 1878, at the Hitotsubashi laboratory of the University of Tokyo Faculty of Science, the first sound recording was made in Japan.

- Former Tokyo Science Museum Main Building

Construction of the building was completed in September 1931 as the main building of the Tokyo Science Museum as part of the reconstruction project following the Great Kanto Earthquake. It was designed in the Neo-Renaissance style. Designed by Kenzo Kasuya, an engineer in the Ministry of Education Minister's Secretariat's Architecture Division, the building was designated an Important Cultural Property on 9 June 2008.

== Exhibition buildings ==
=== Nihonkan (Japan Gallery) ===
The theme of the Ueno Main Building is "Aiming for the coexistence of humankind and nature", and consists of two exhibition halls, the Japan Pavilion and the Earth Pavilion.

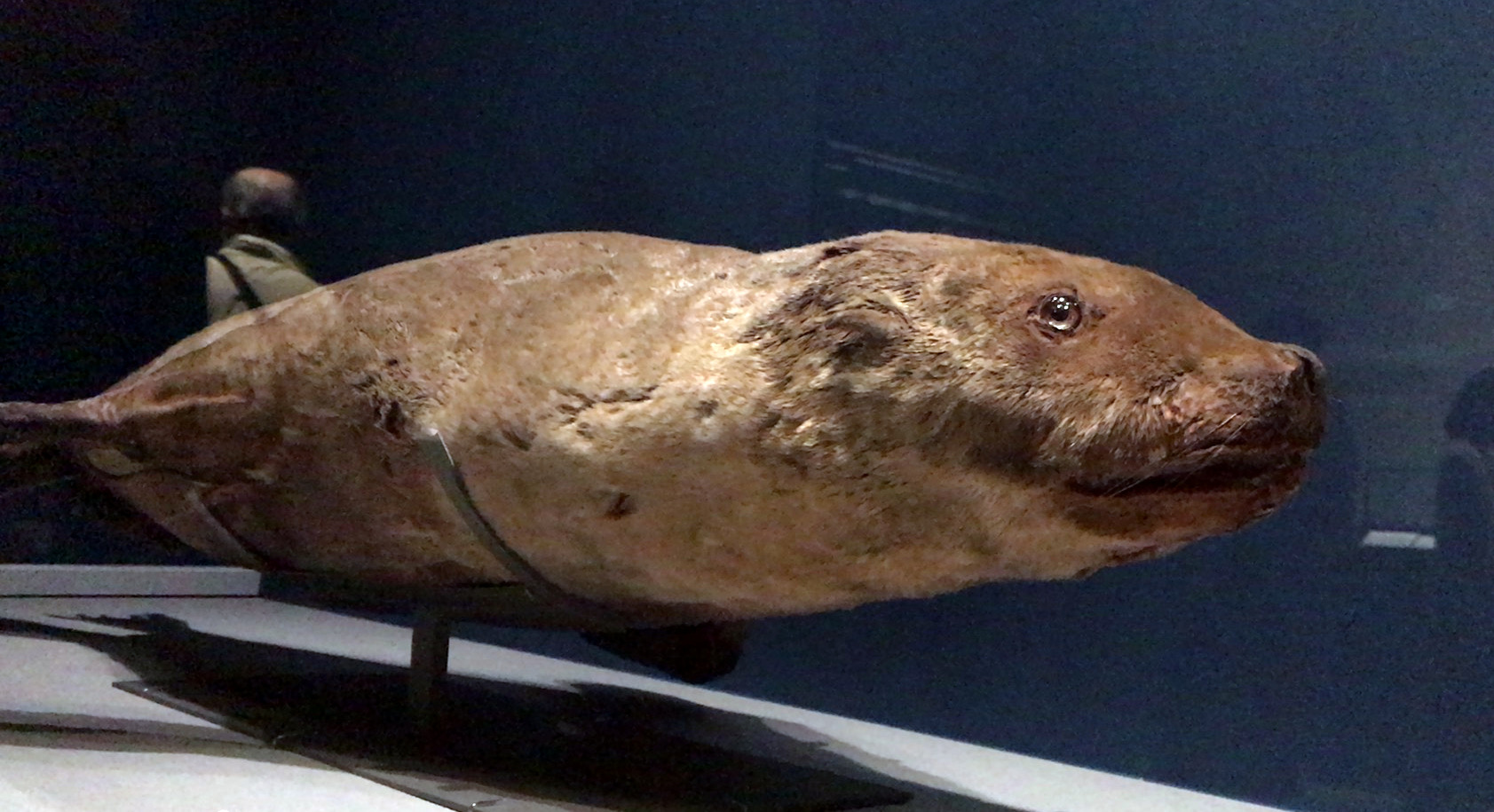
Zalophus japonicus

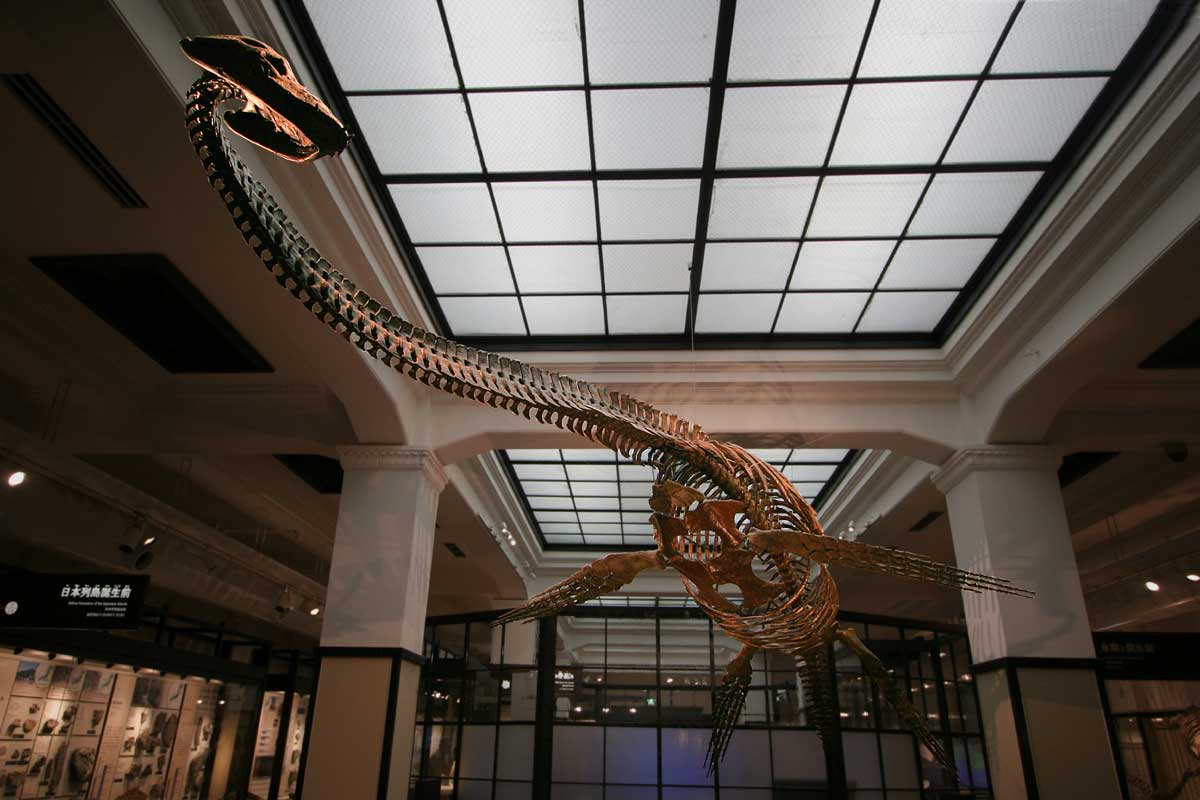
Futabasaurus

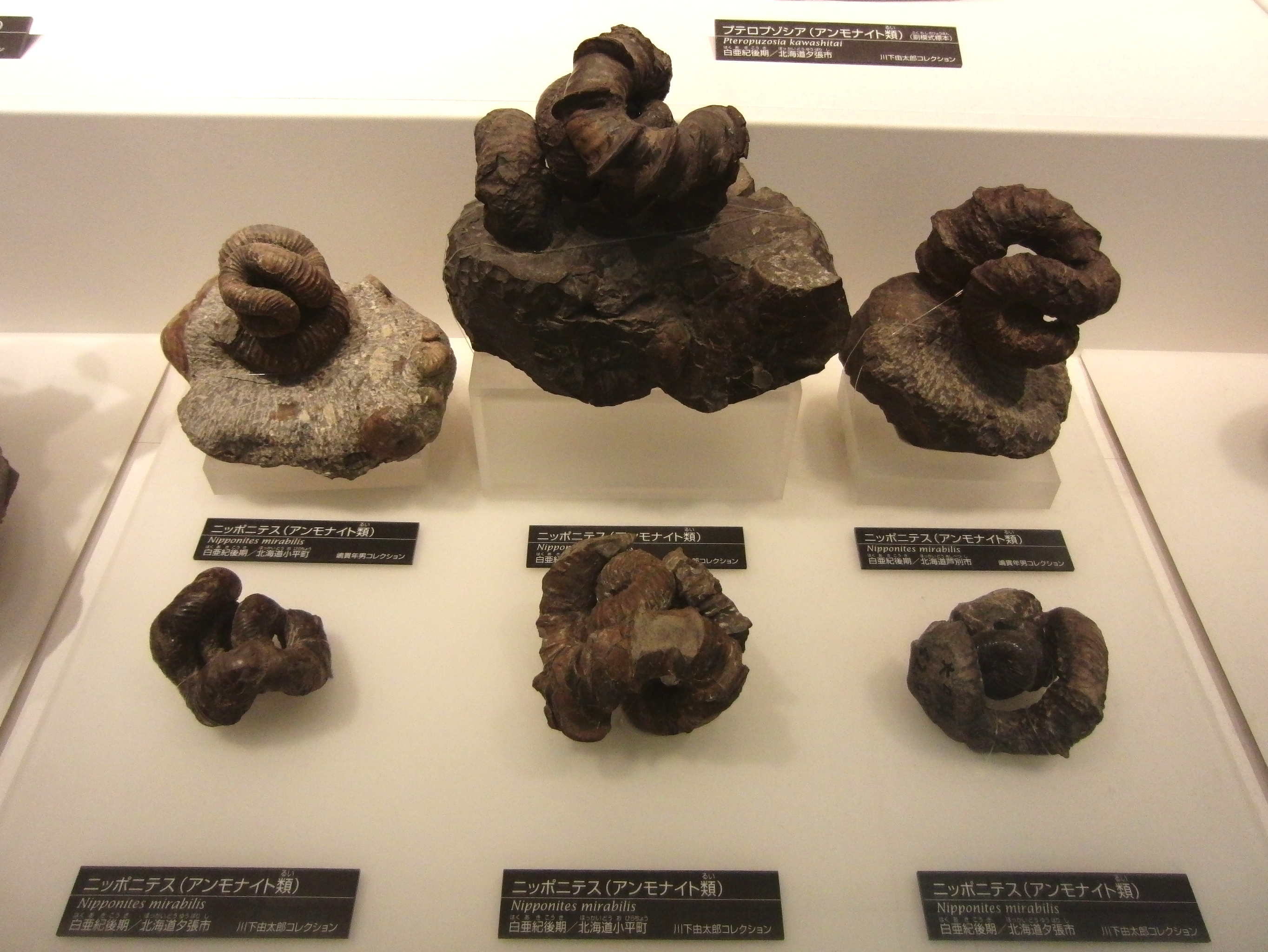
Nipponites ammonites

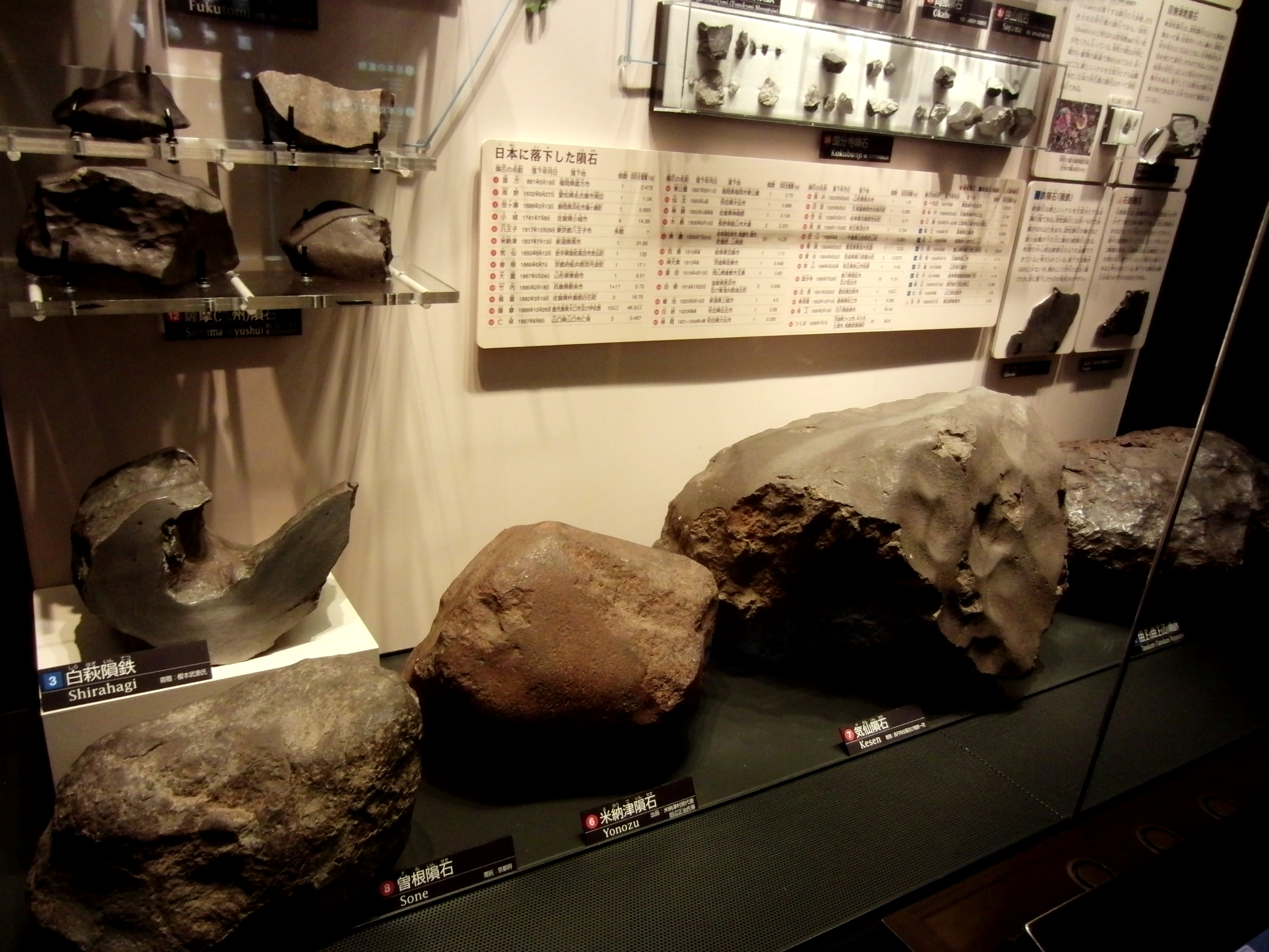
Meteorites fell in Japan

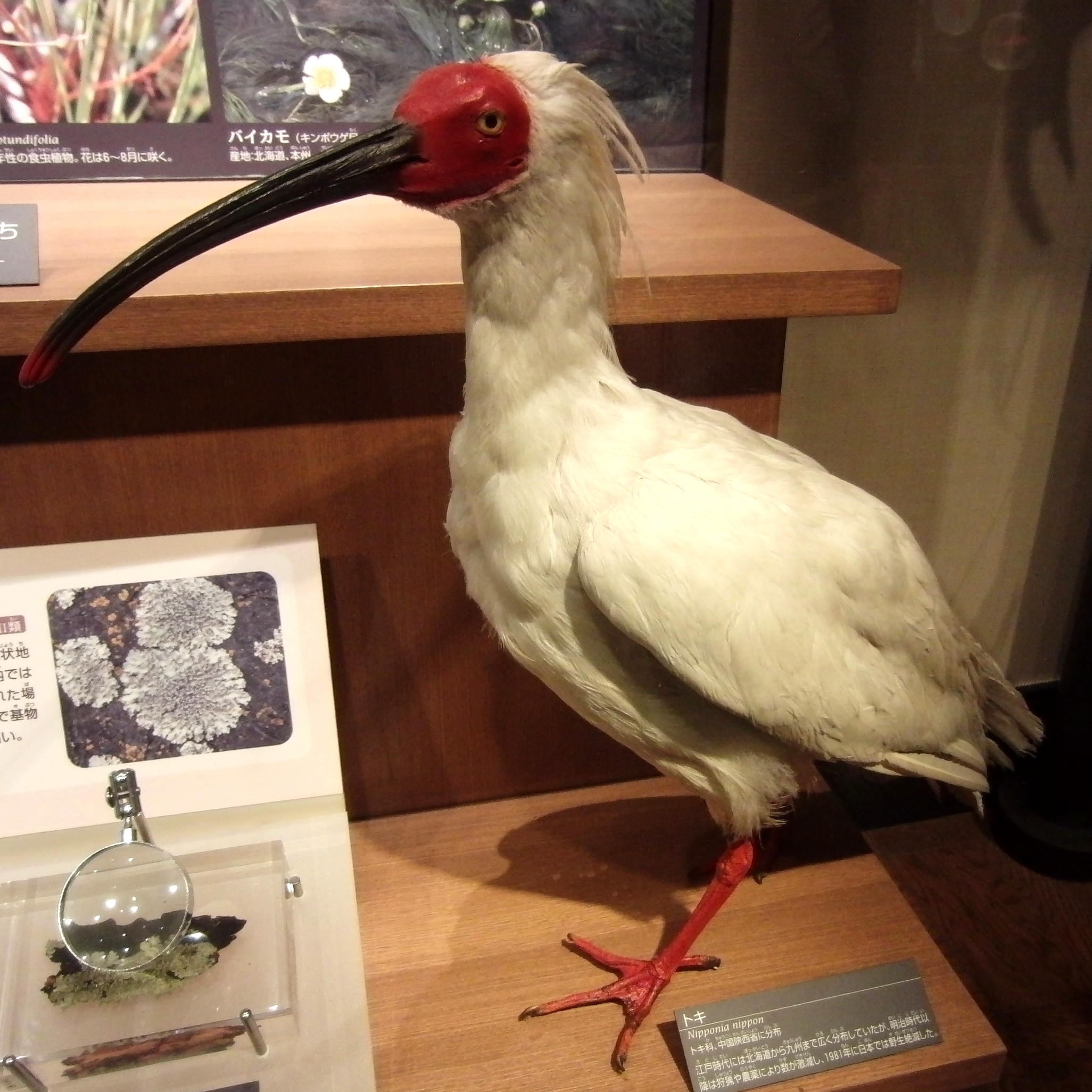
Japanese crested ibis (Nipponia nippon)

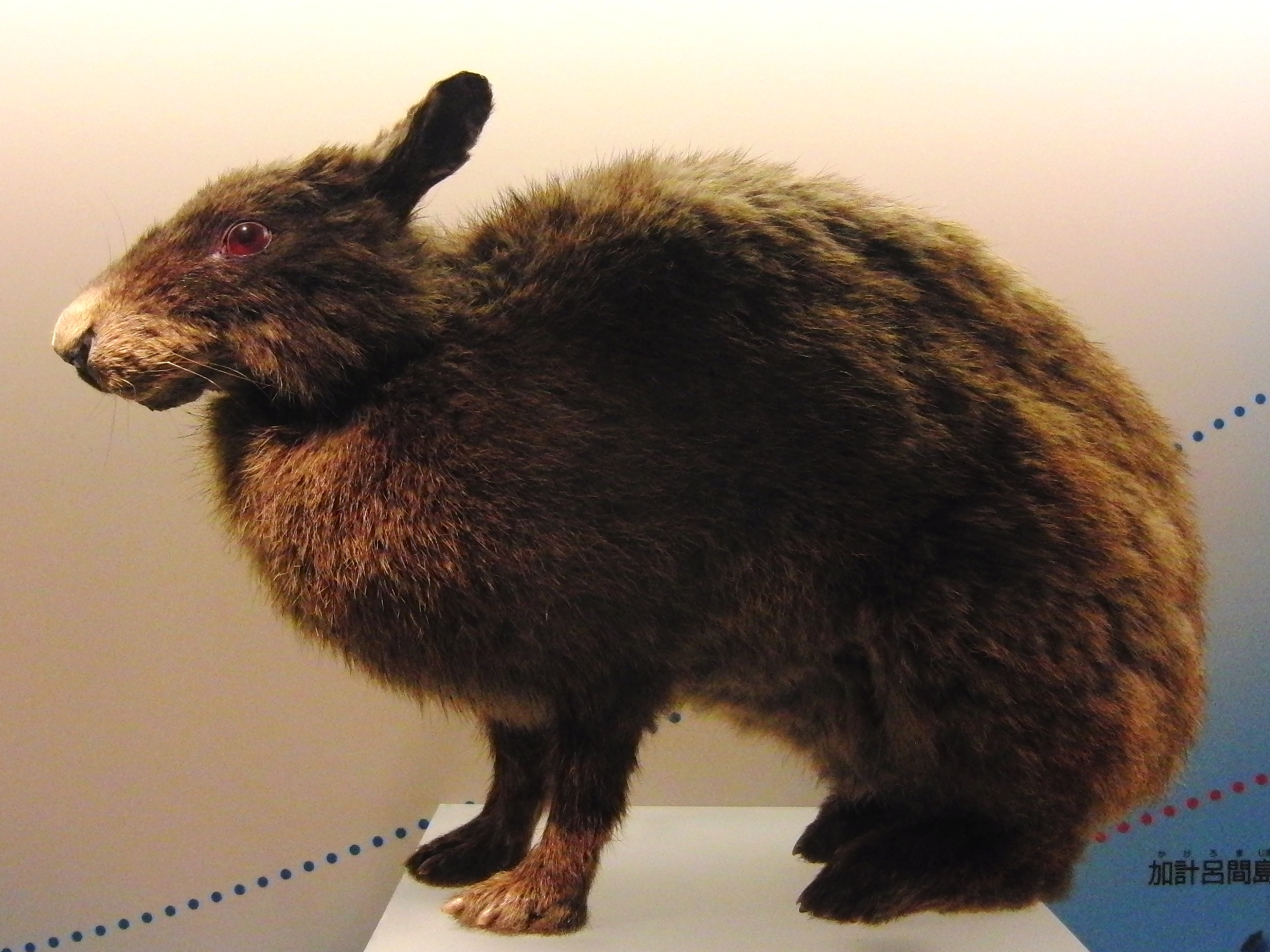
Amami rabbit

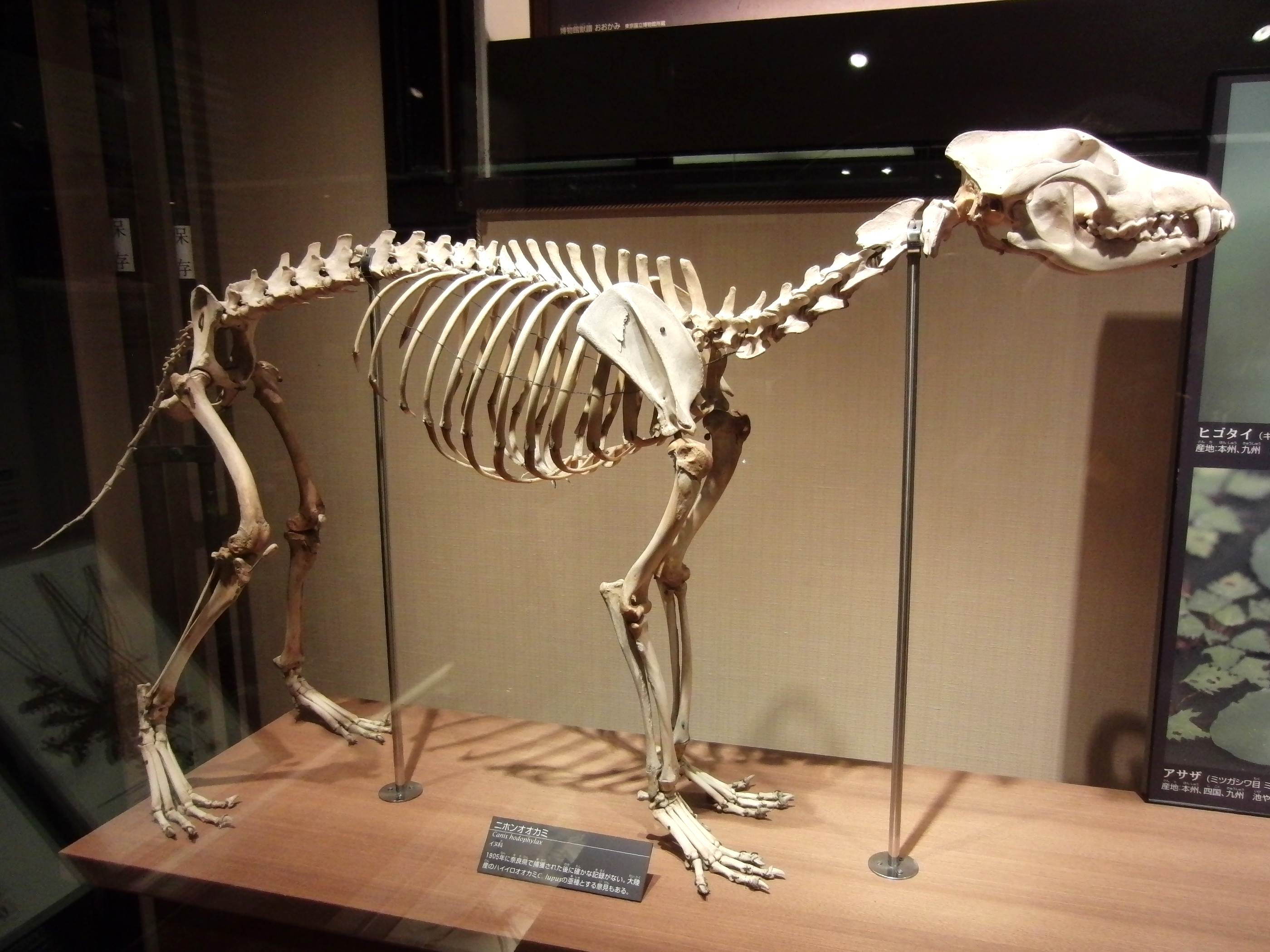
Honshu wolf (Japanese wolf)

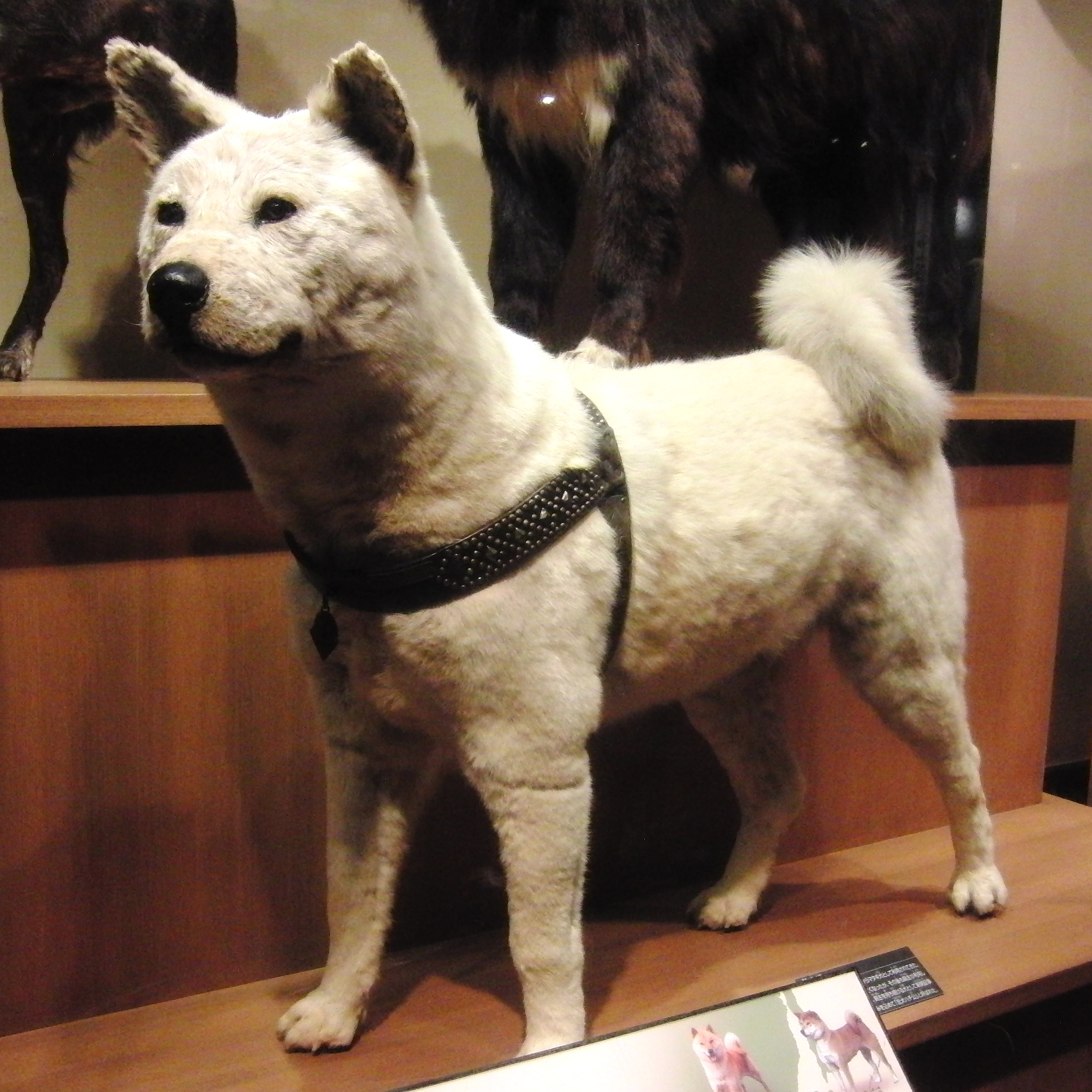
Hachikō

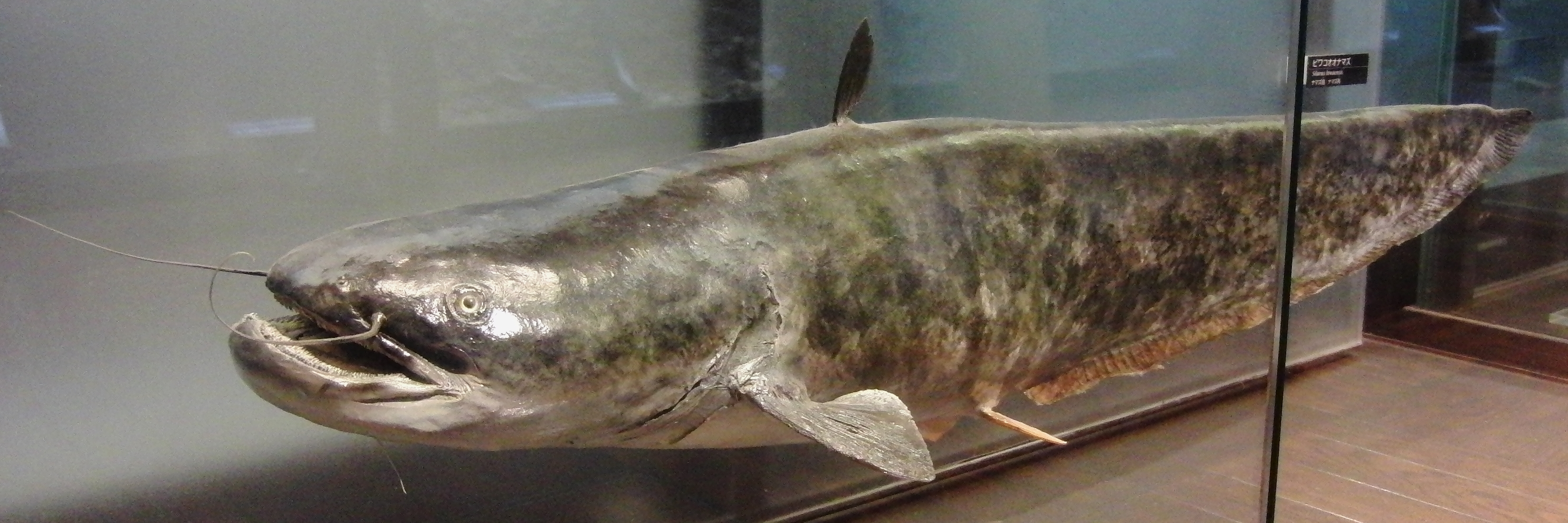
Silurus biwaensis

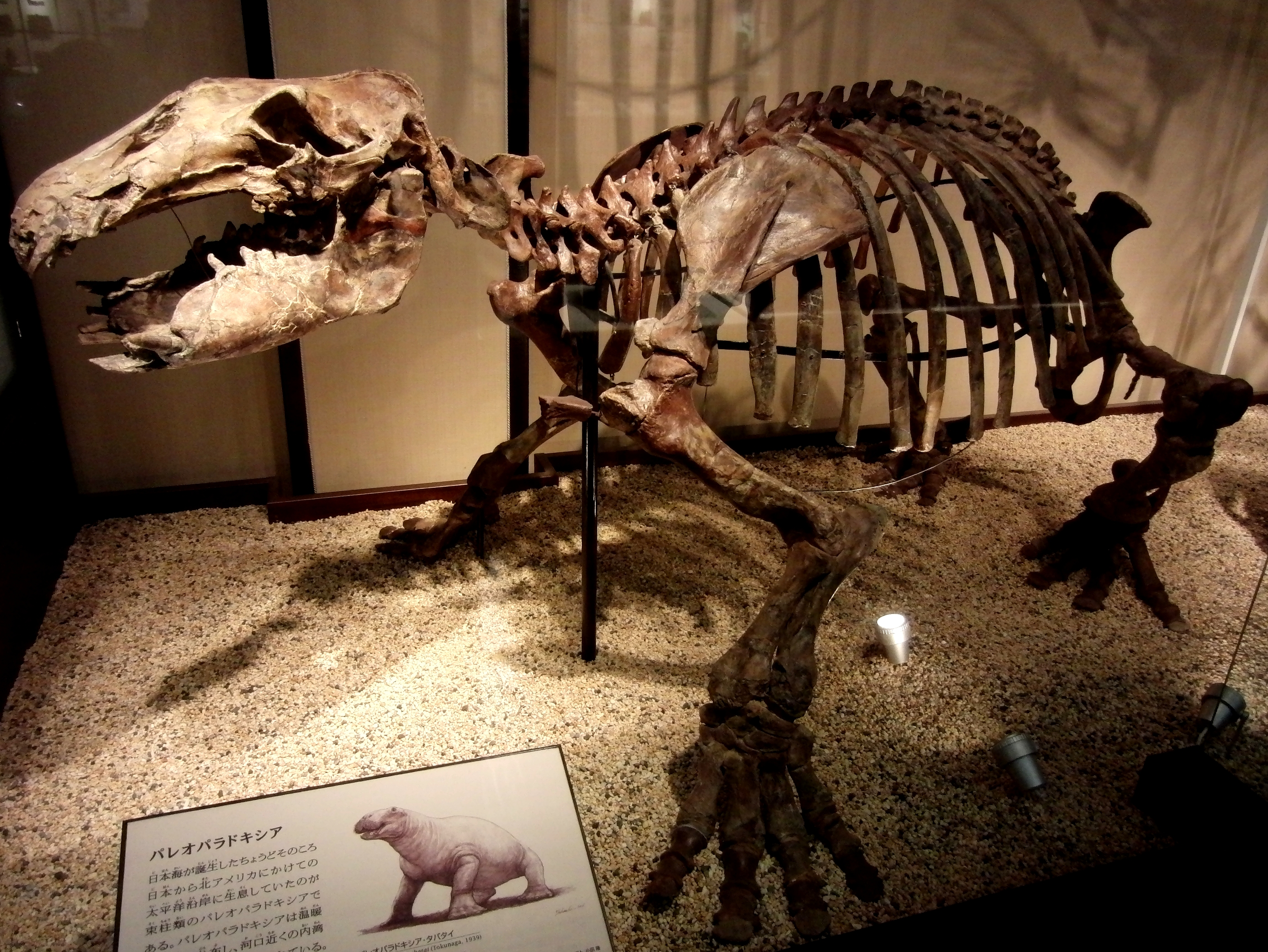
Paleoparadoxia skeleton

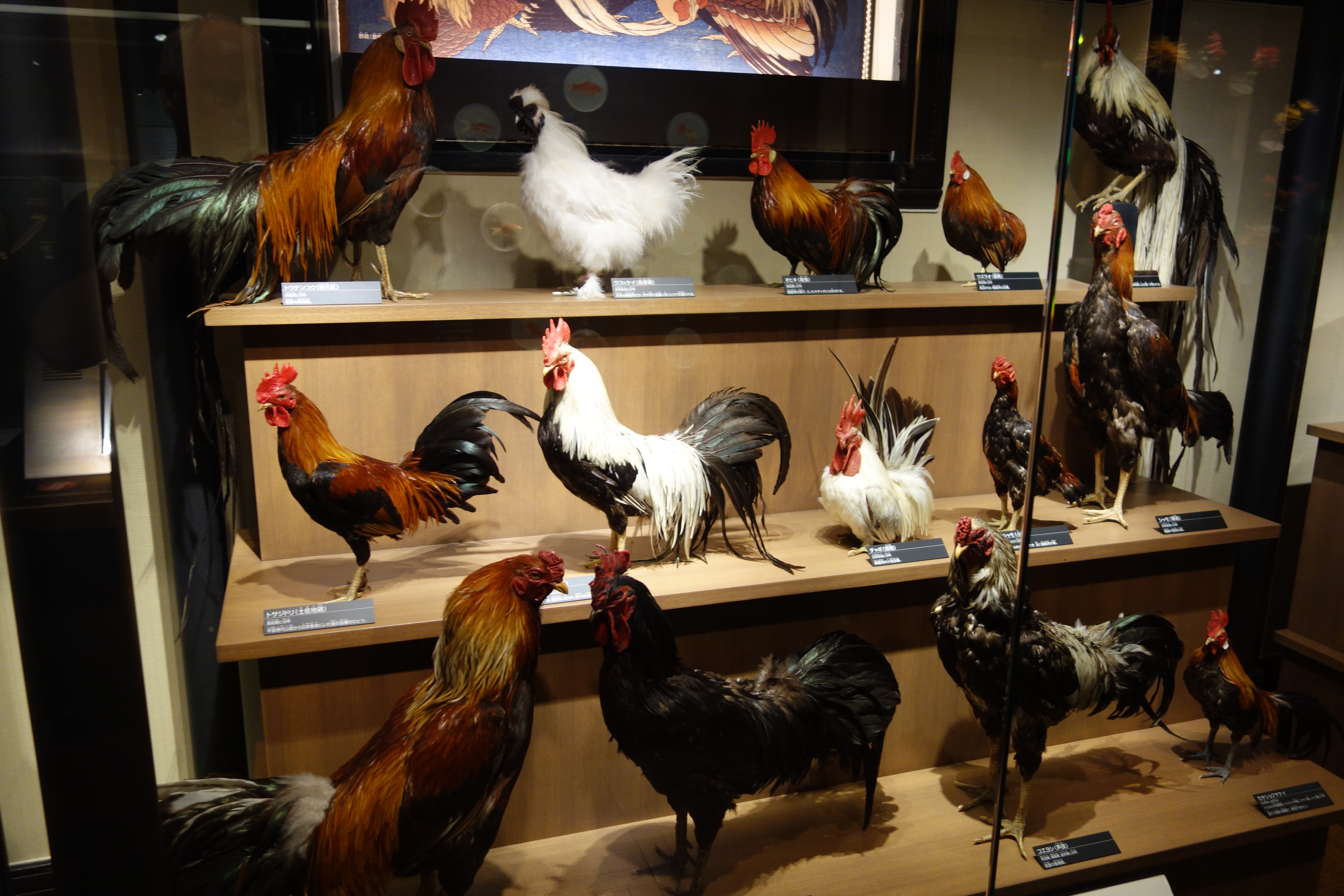
Roosters

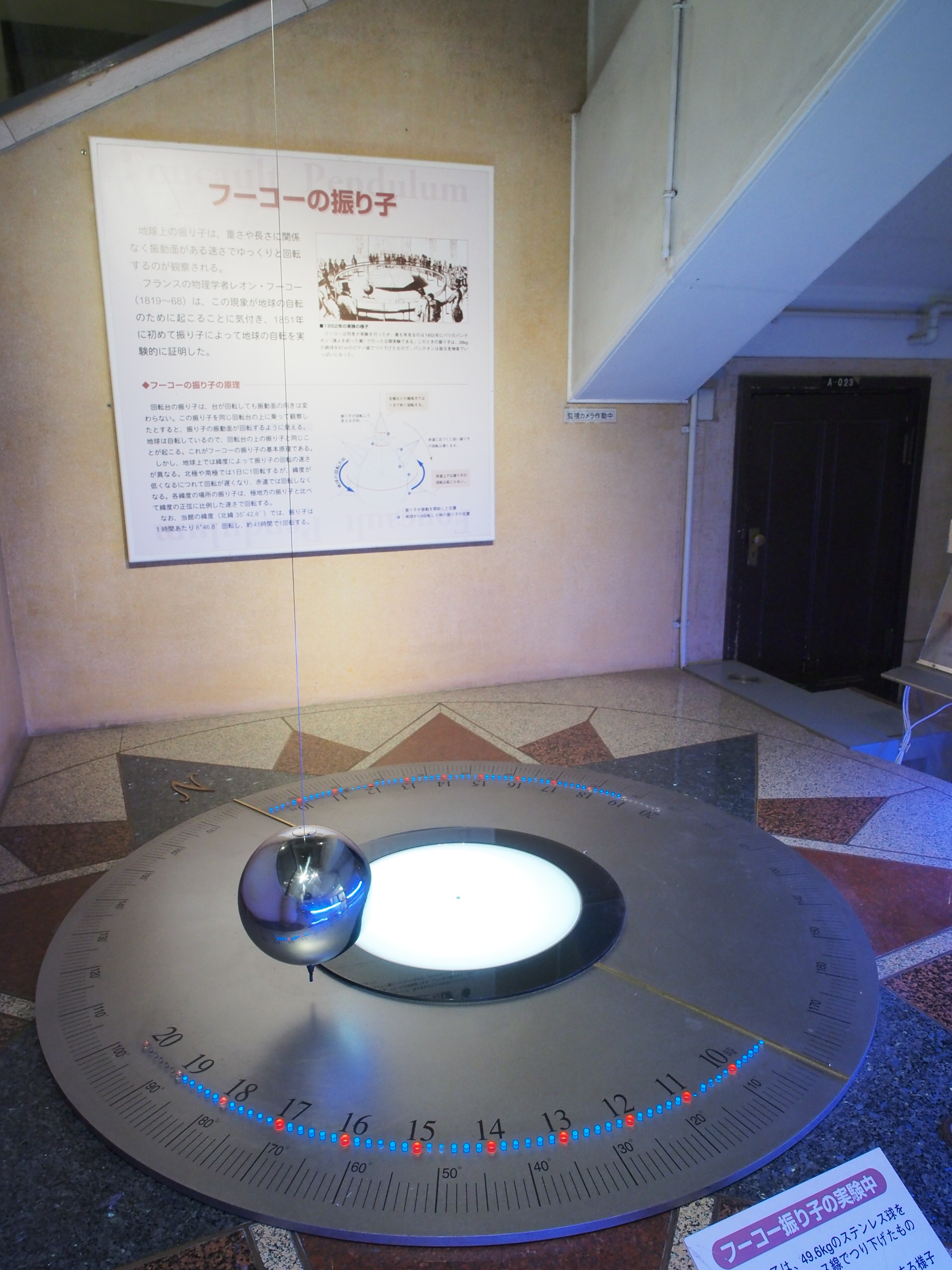
Foucault pendulum

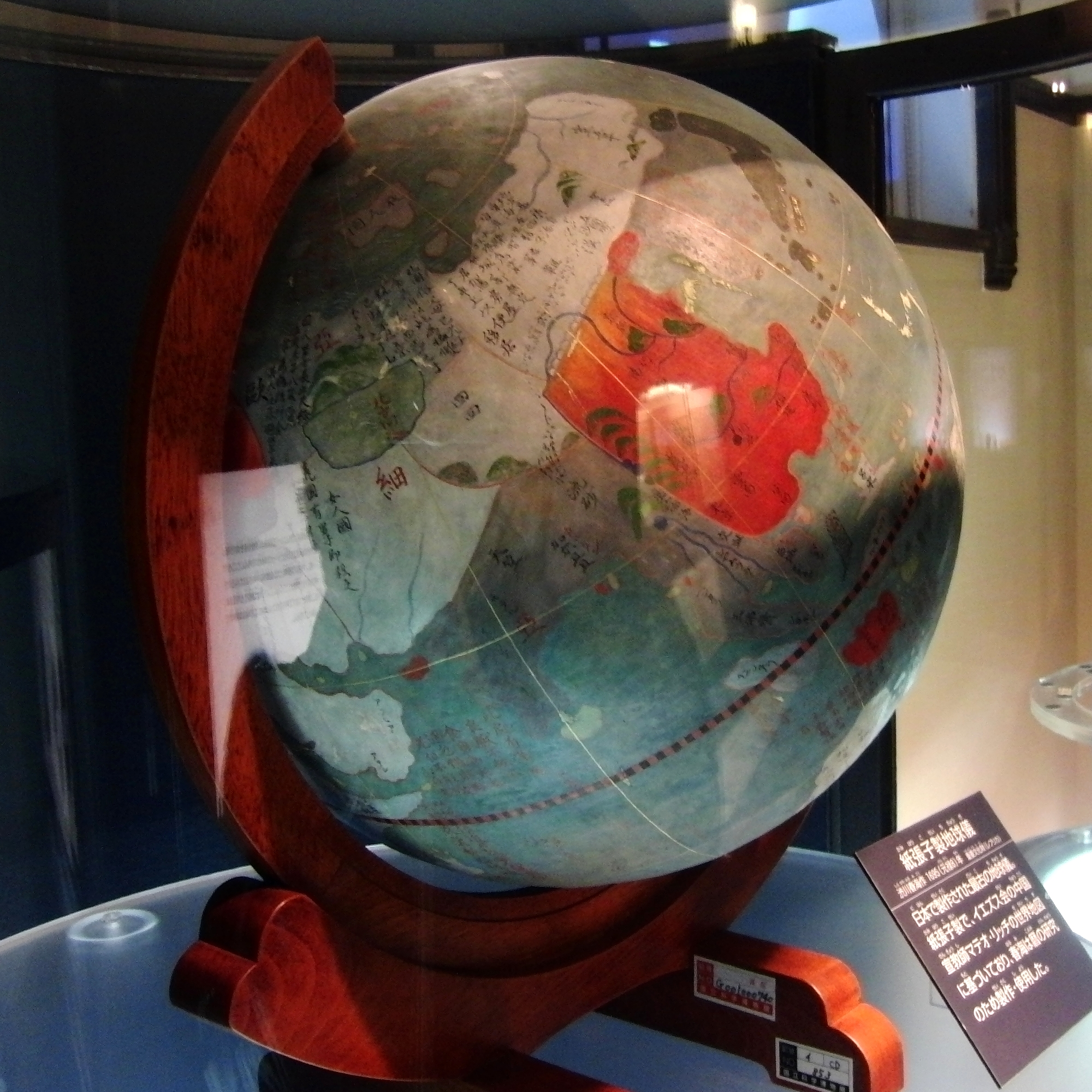
Papier-mache terrestrial globe, created by Shibukawa Shunkai in 1695. Important Cultural Properties of Japan

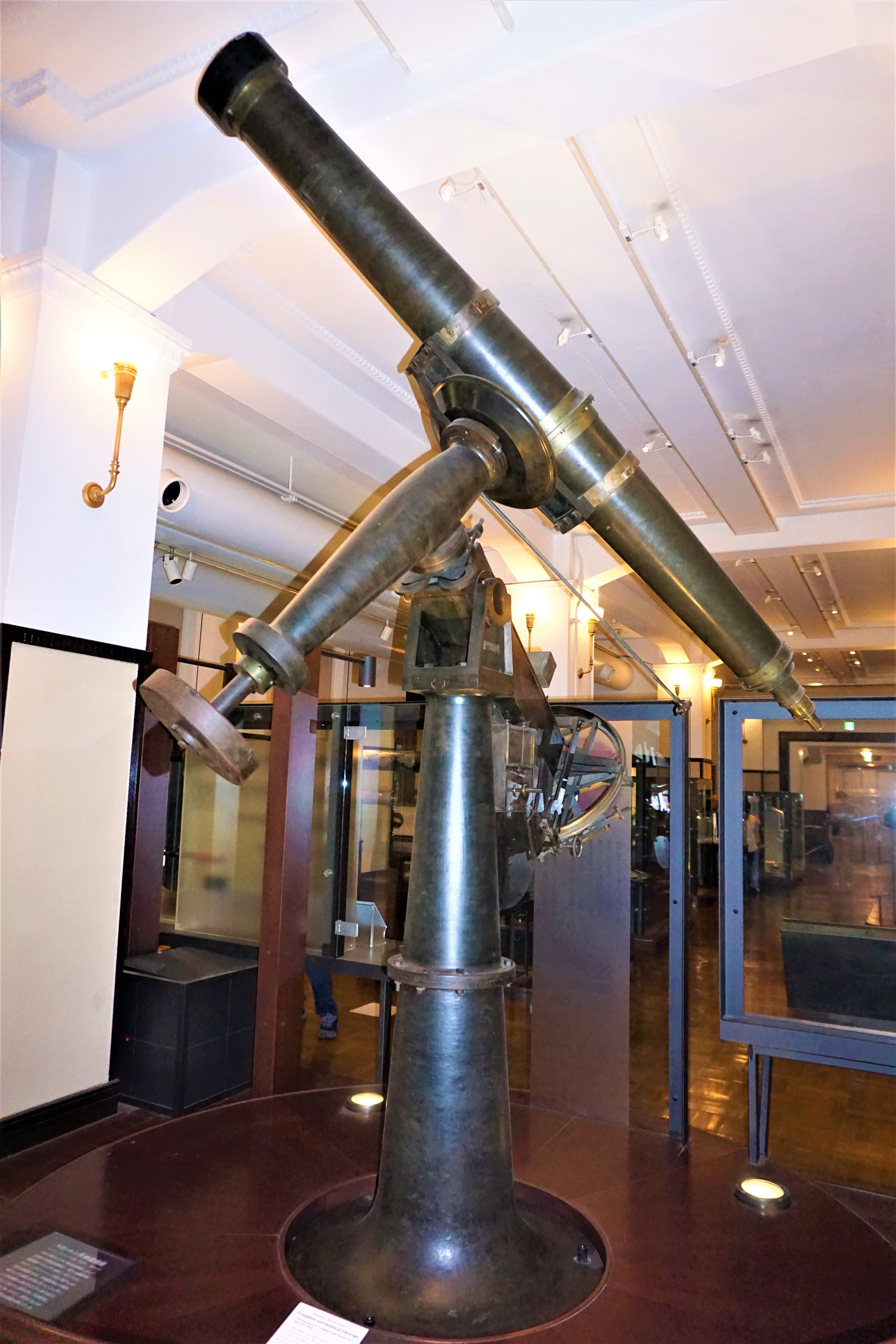
Troughton & Simms astronomical telescope, 19th century. Important Cultural Properties of Japan

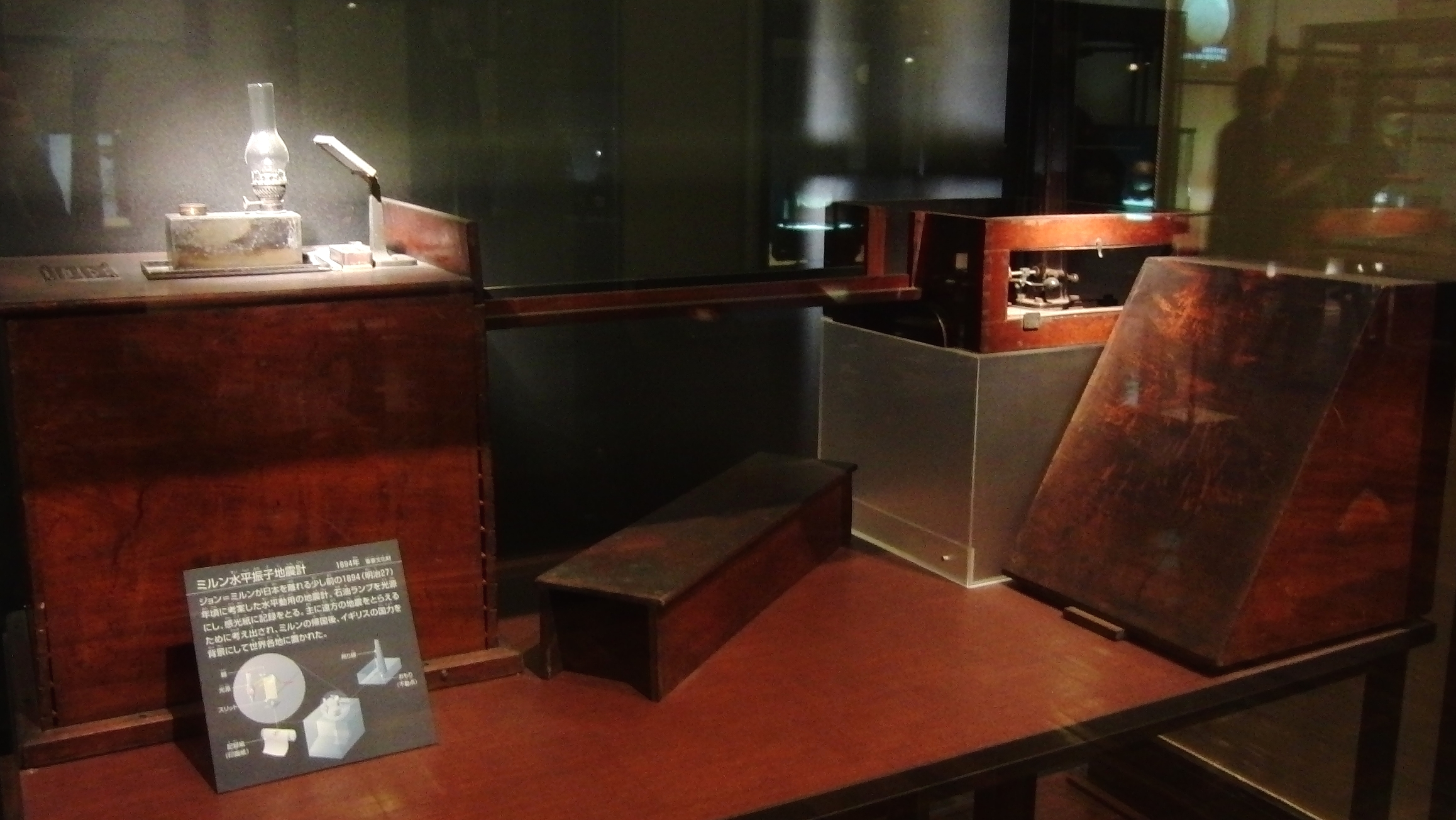
Milne horizontal pendulum seismograph. Important Cultural Properties of Japan

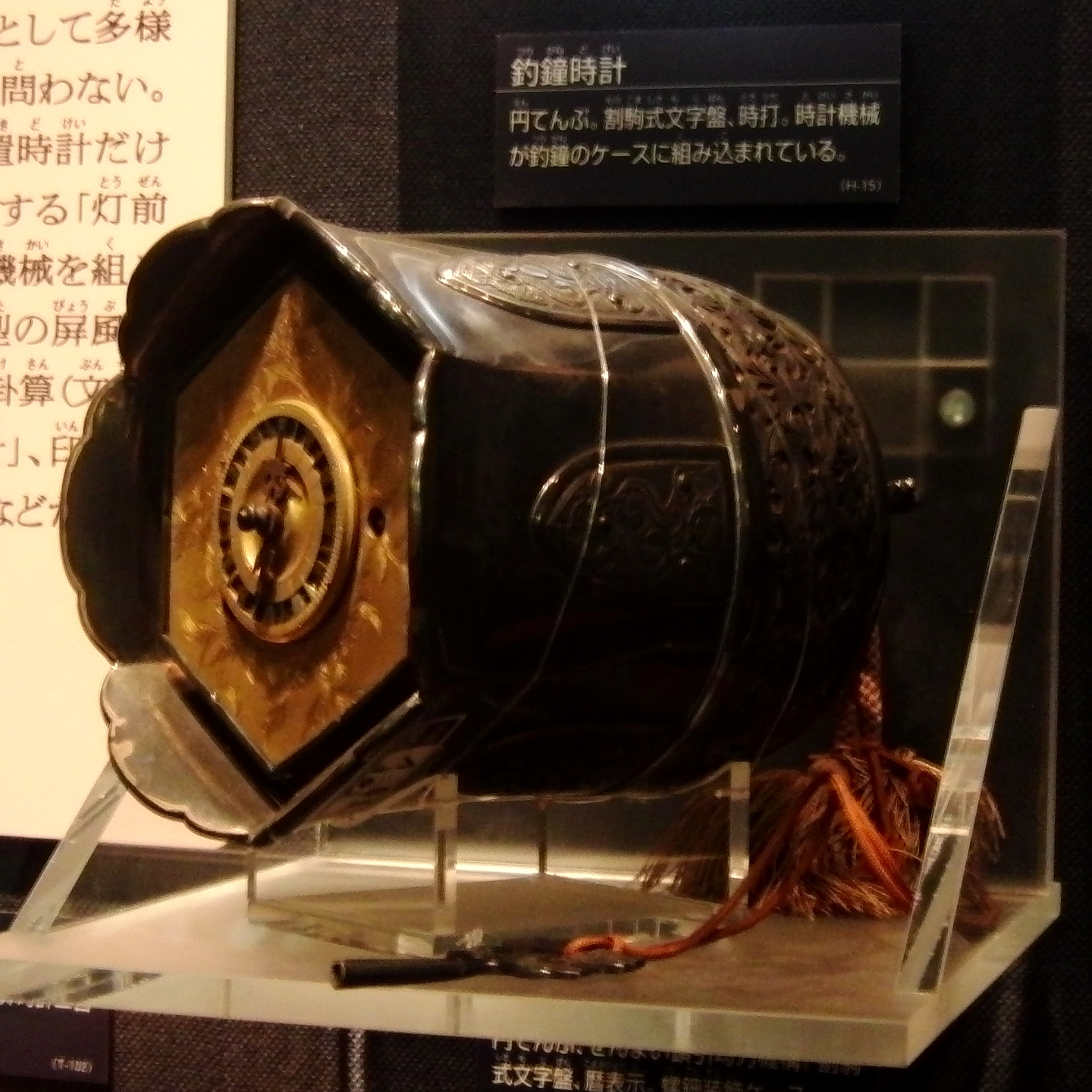
Tsurigane-dokei (hanging bell-shaped clock)

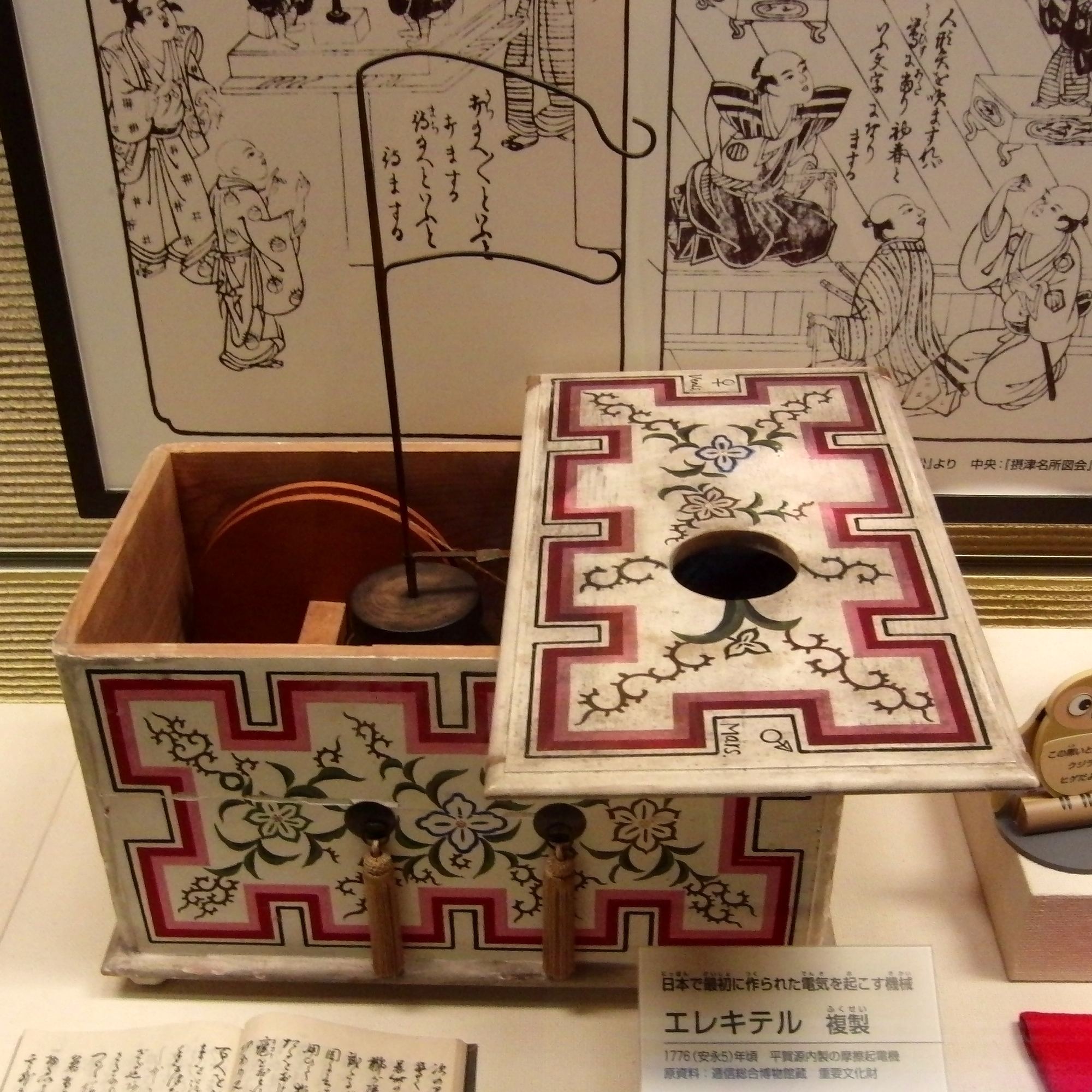
The Elekiter (replica) made by Hiraga Gennai

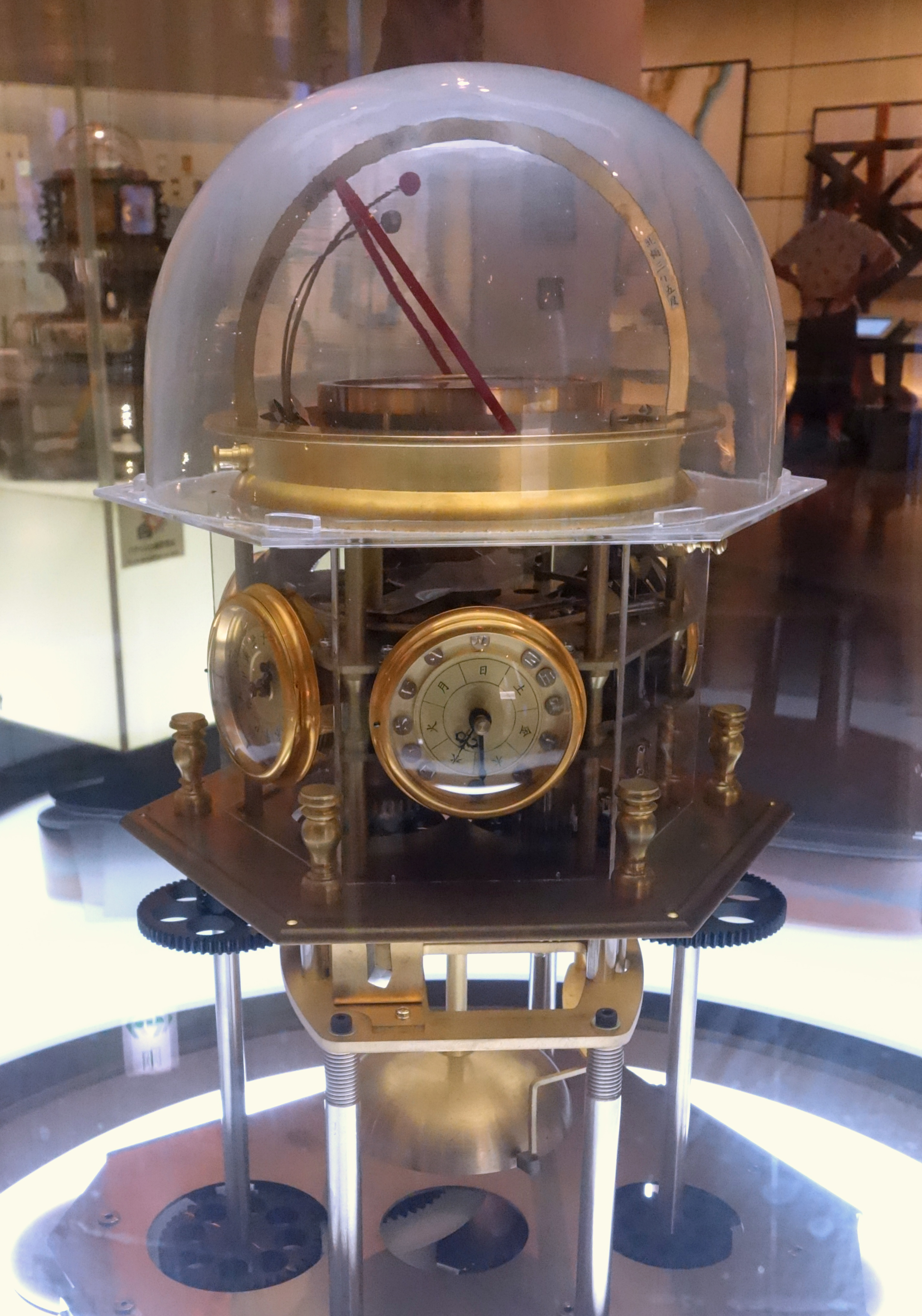
Clockwork

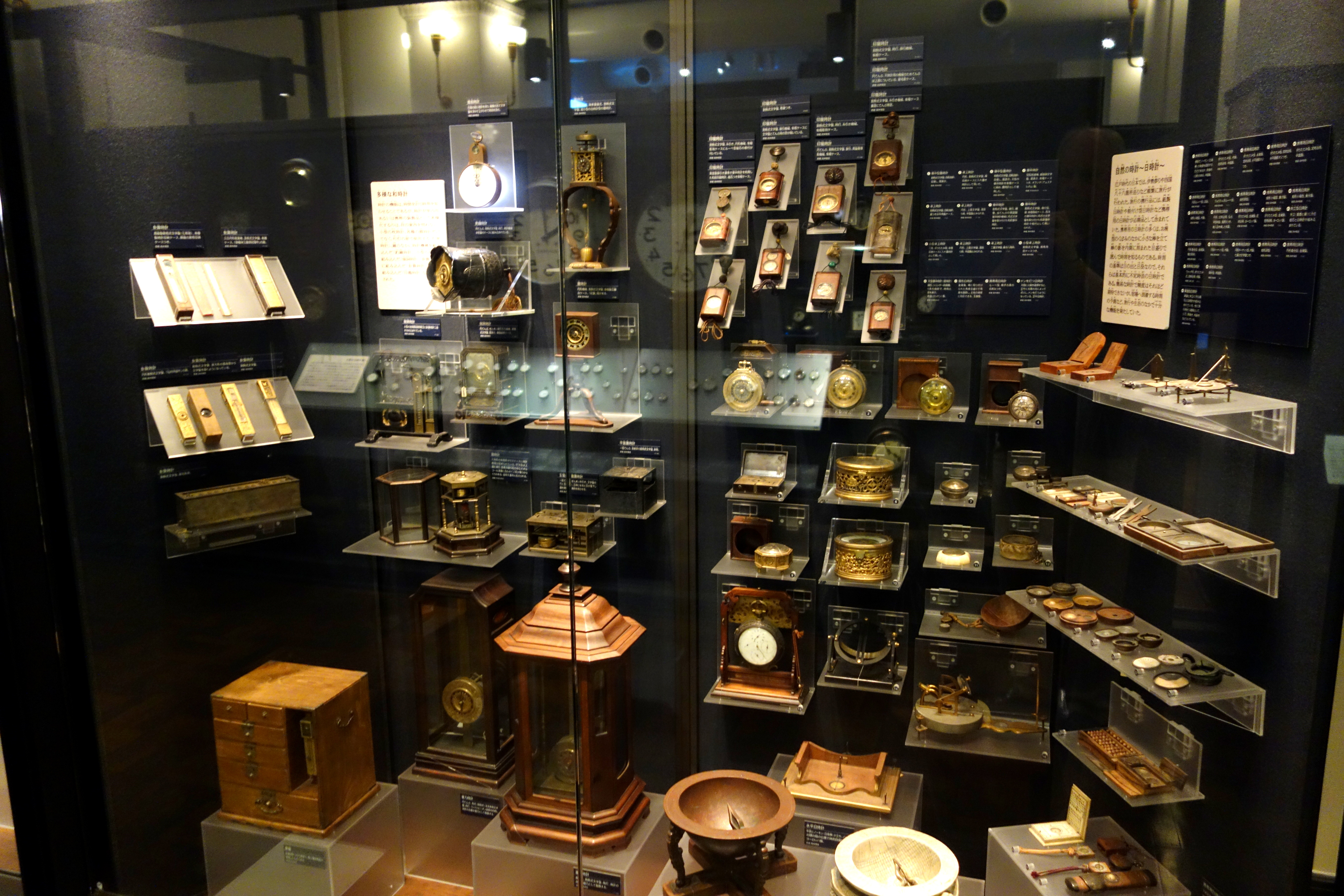
Clock exhibit

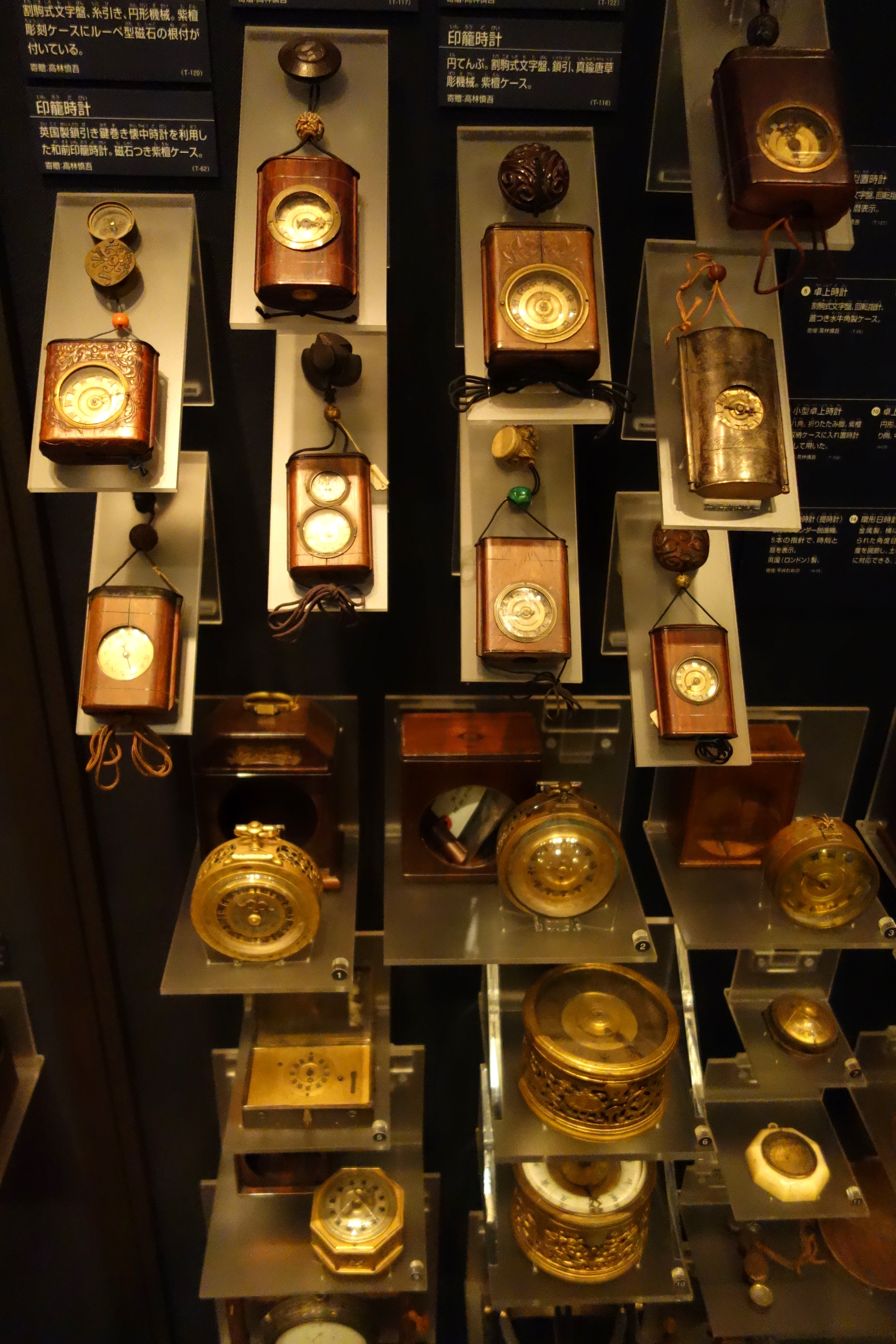
Clock exhibit

=== Chikyūkan (Global Gallery) ===
The theme is "History of Earth Life and Mankind". The exhibition area is 3 floors above ground and 3 floors below ground. The first phase of construction was completed in 1998. The permanent exhibition will be open to the public from 24 April, the following year. Grand opening on 2 November 2004 after the completion of the second phase of construction. The renovation work of the north exhibition hall started in September 2014, and the construction was completed the following year, and the grand opening was held on 14 July.

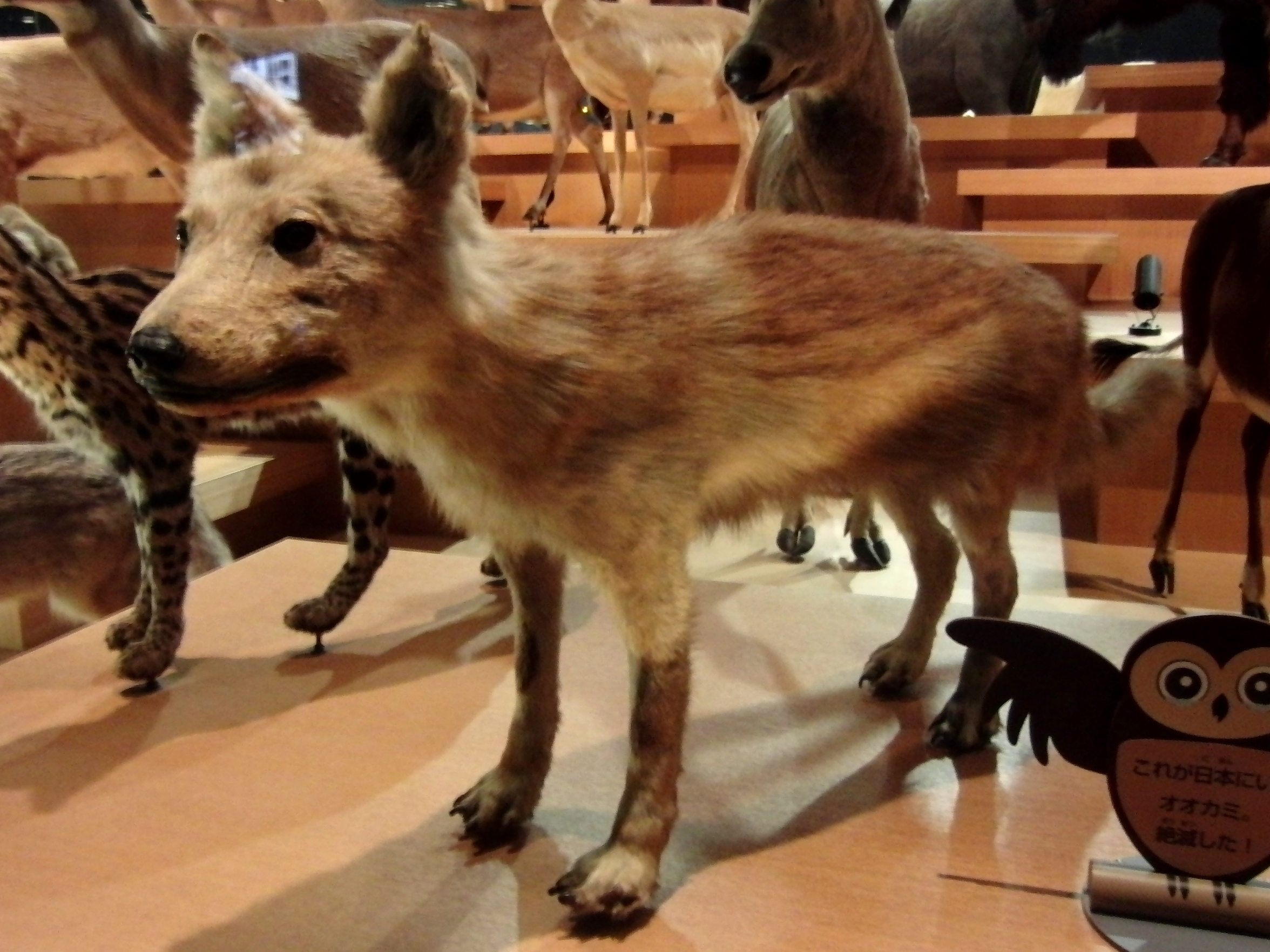
Honshu wolf (Japanese wolf)

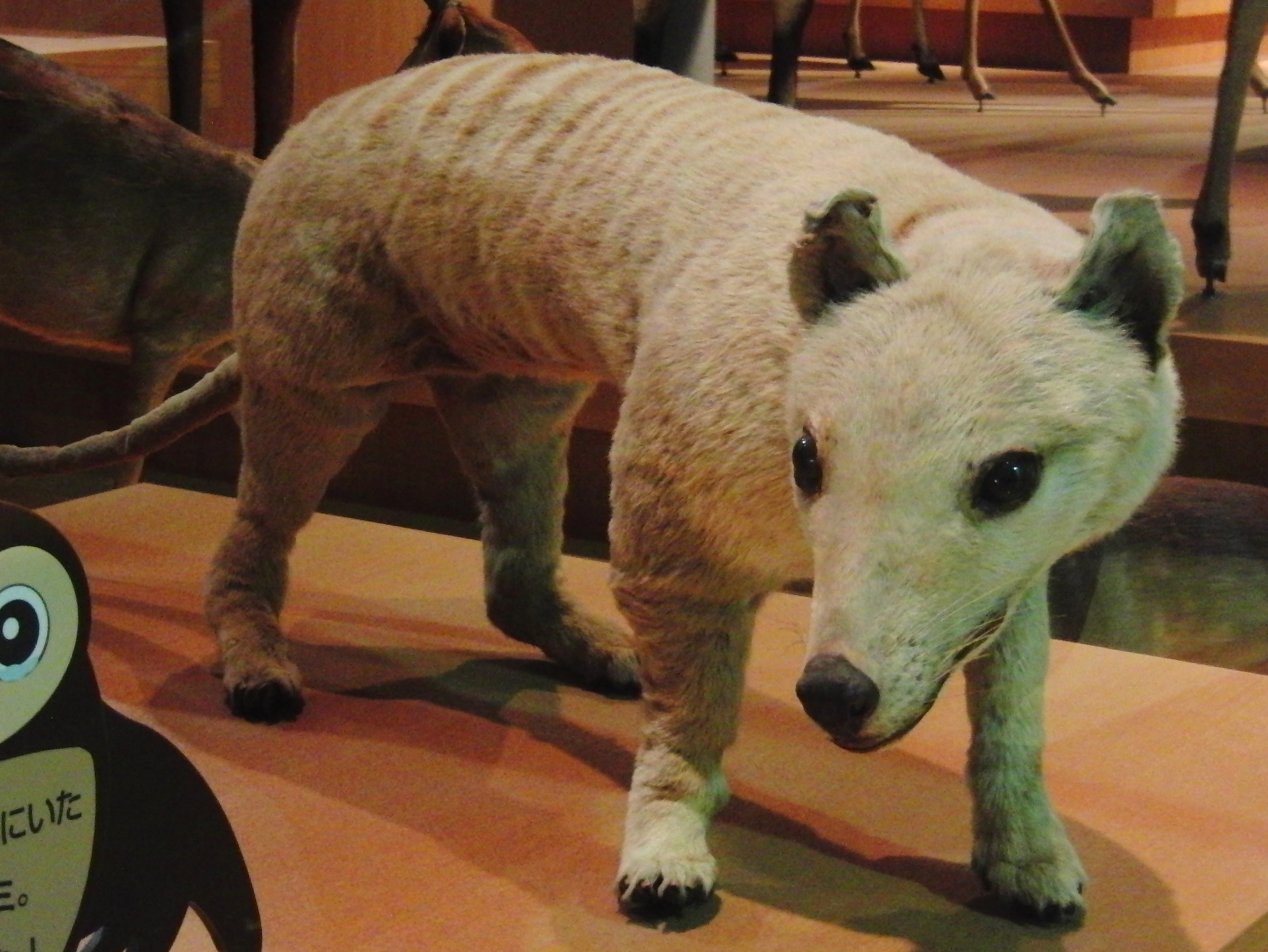
Thylacine

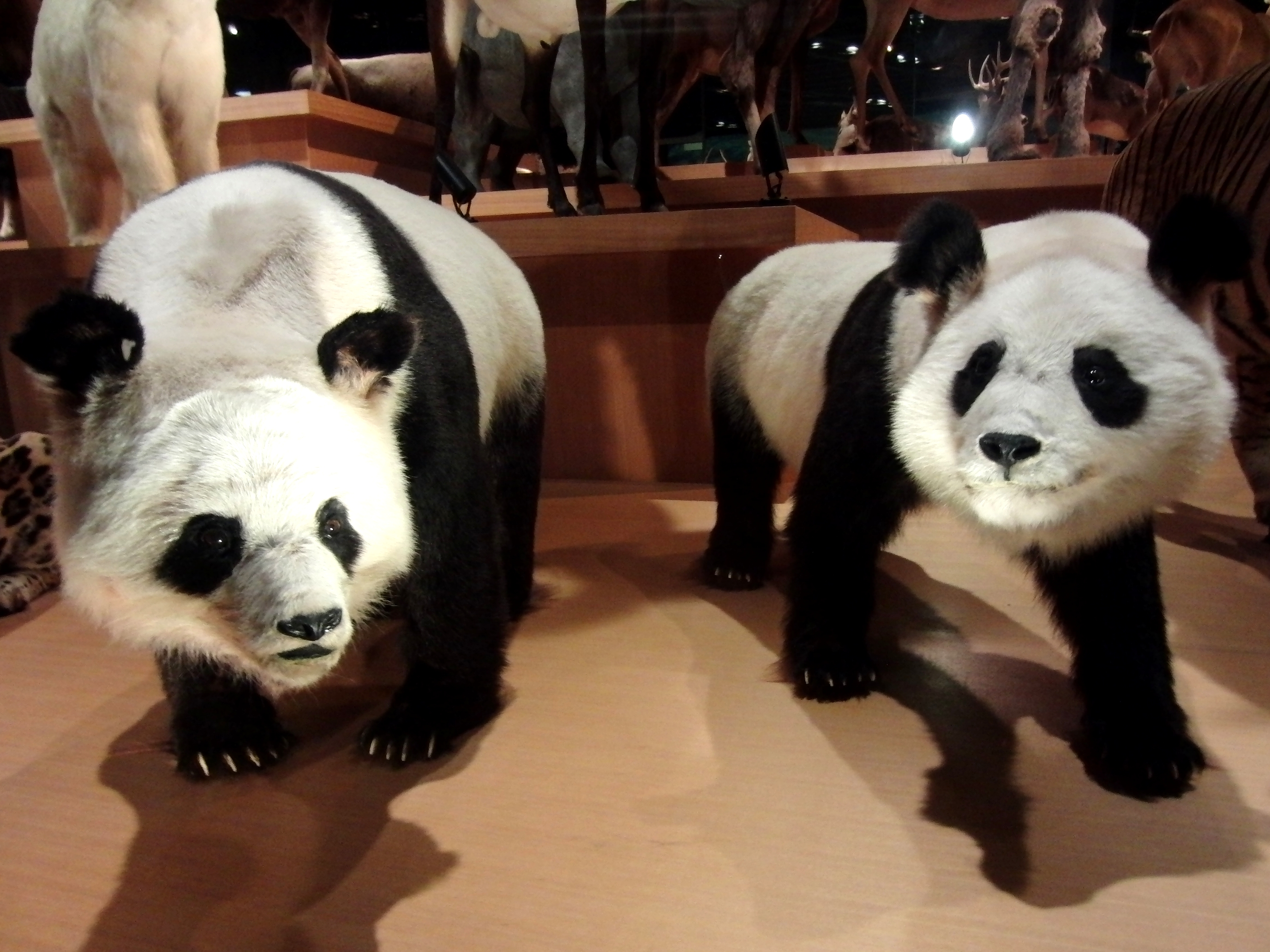
Giant pandas named "Fei Fei" (left) and "Tong Tong" (right)

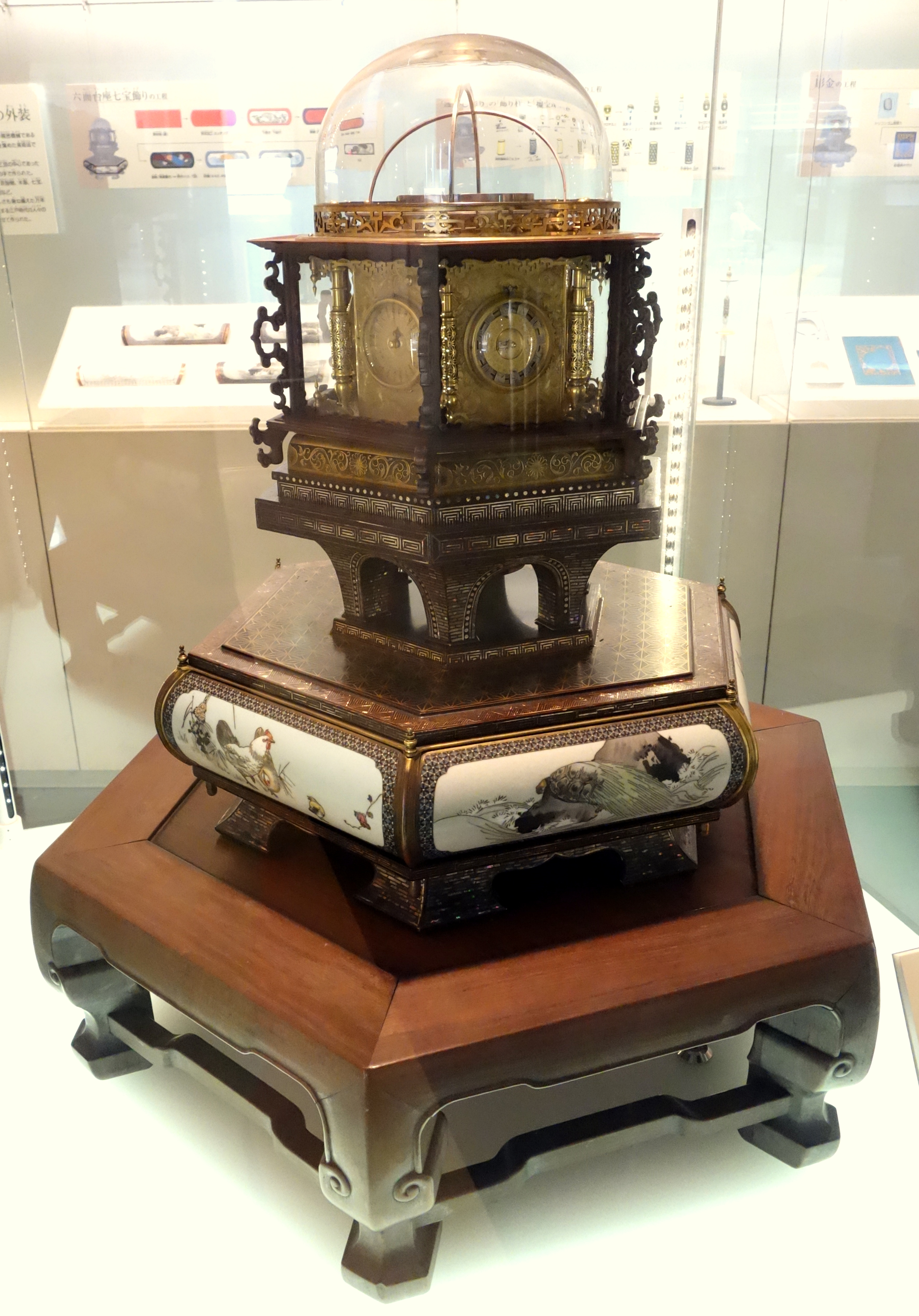
Myriad year clock, 19th century. Important Cultural Properties of Japan

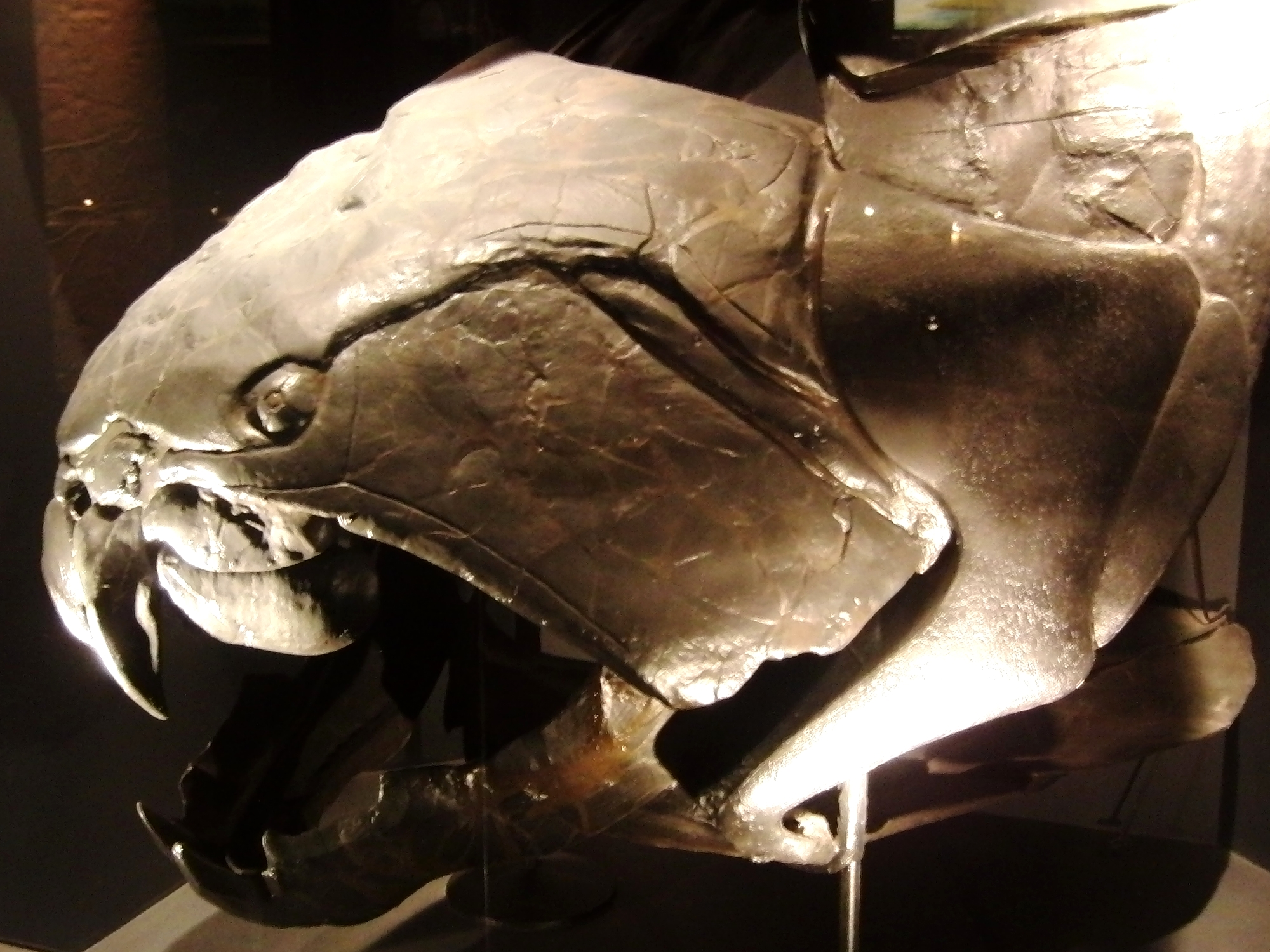
Dunkleosteus terrelli

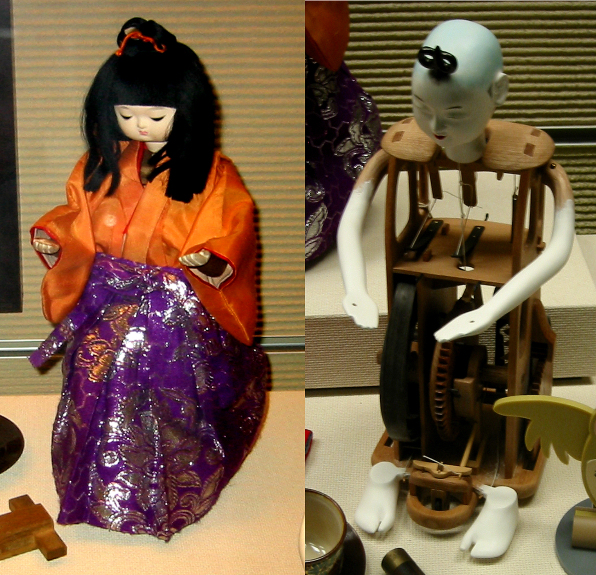
Karakuri ningyō

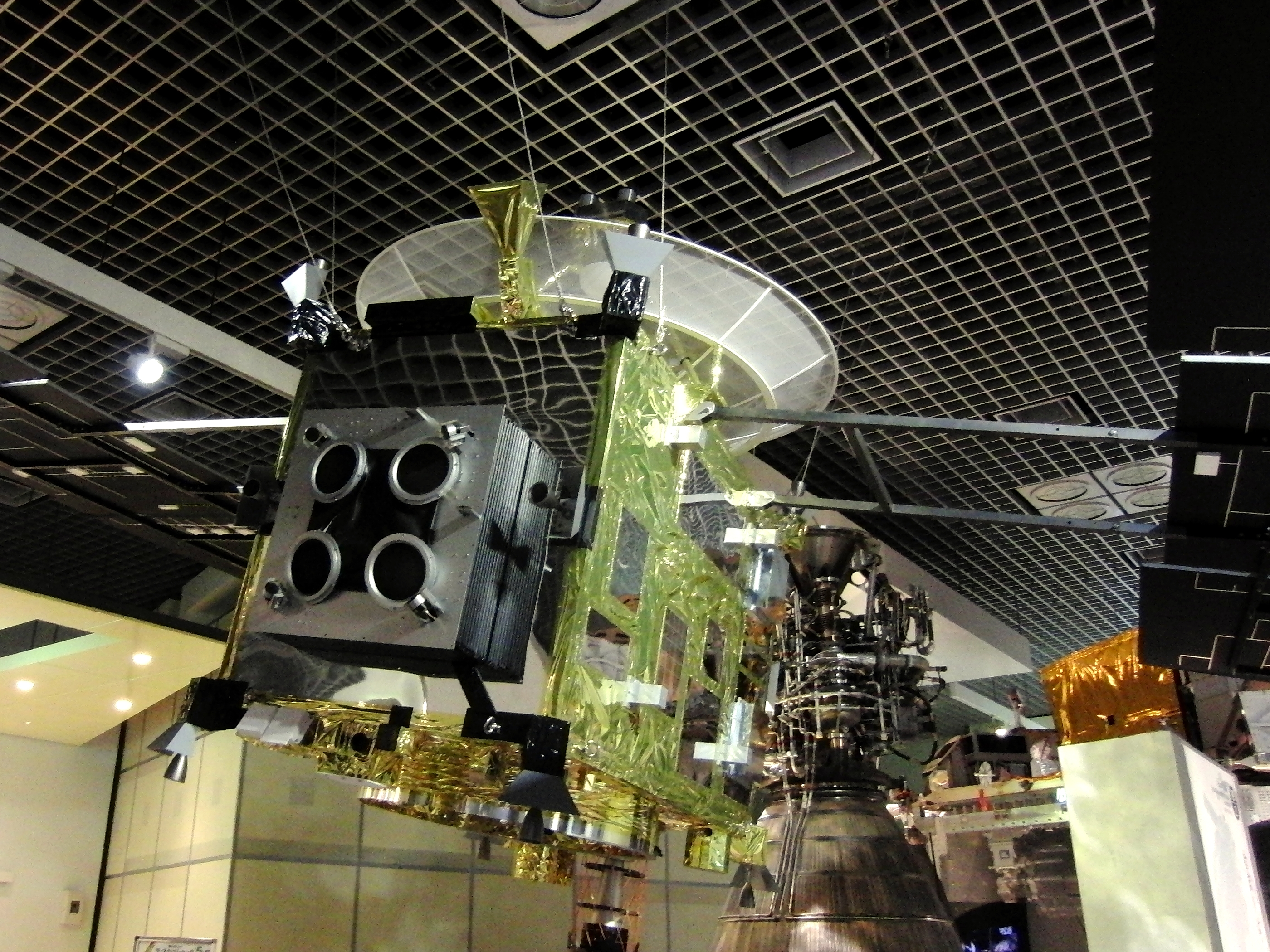
Hayabusa model

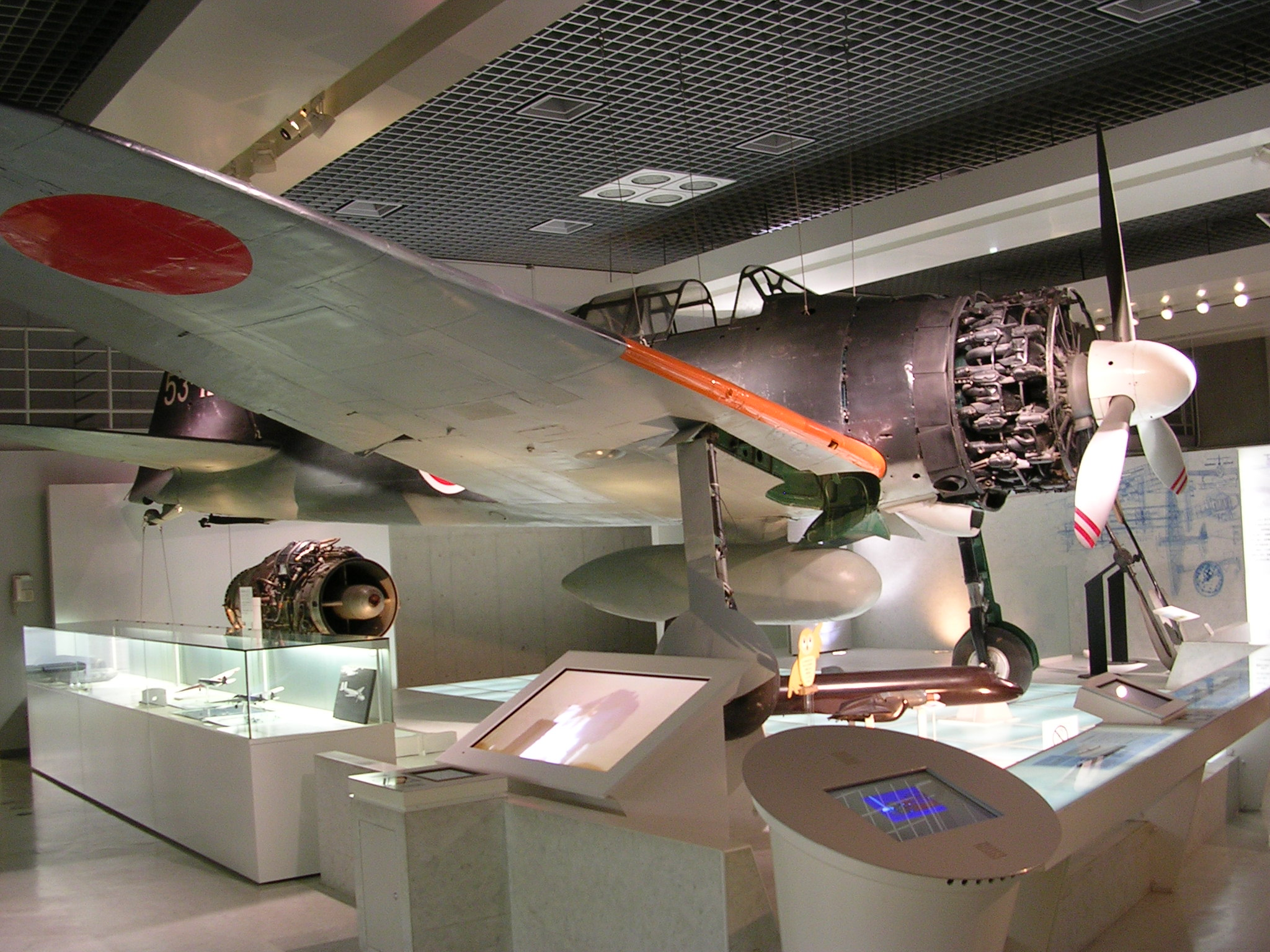
Mitsubishi A6M Zero (Zero Fighter) Model 21

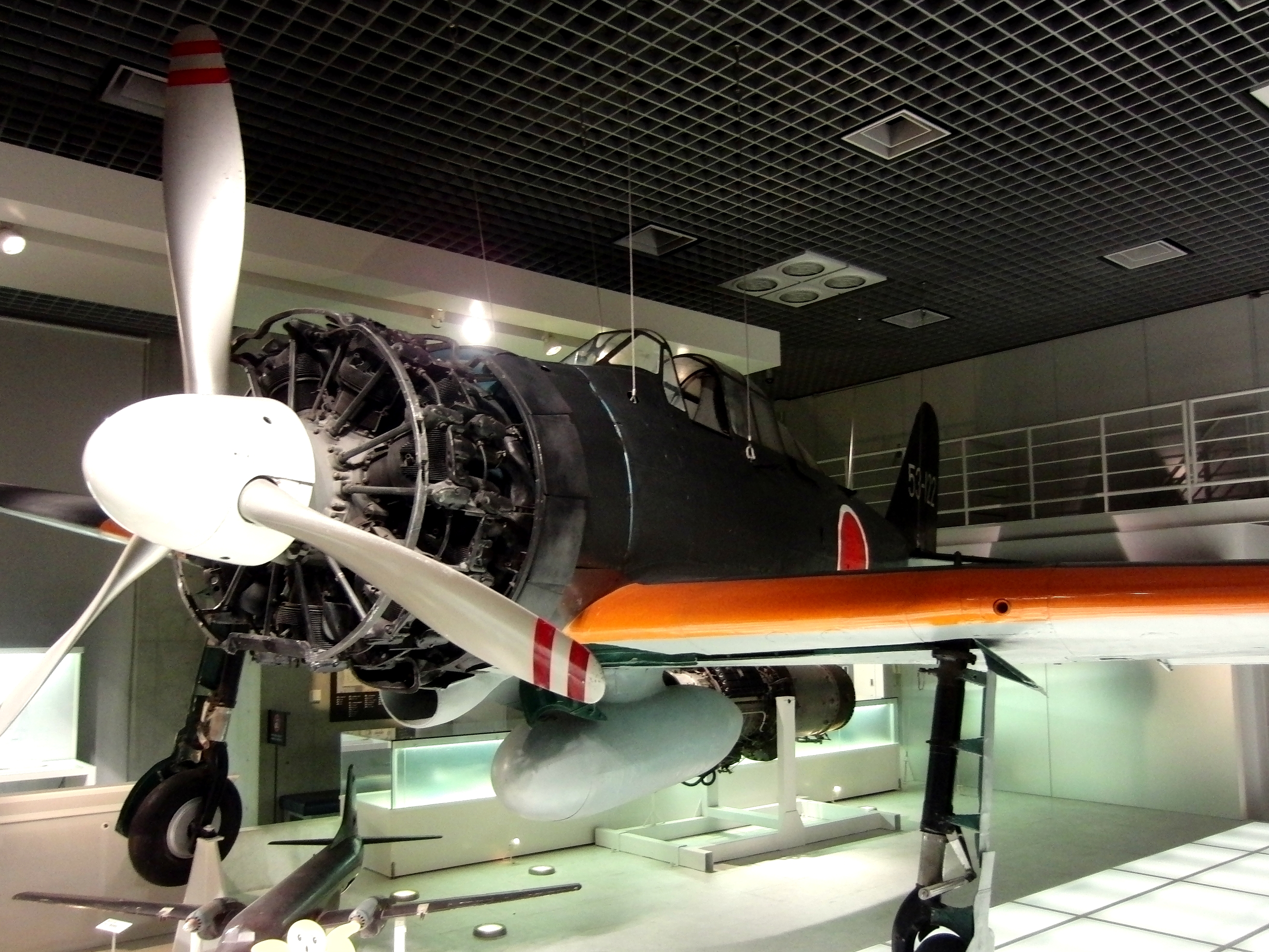
Zero Fighter Plane Model

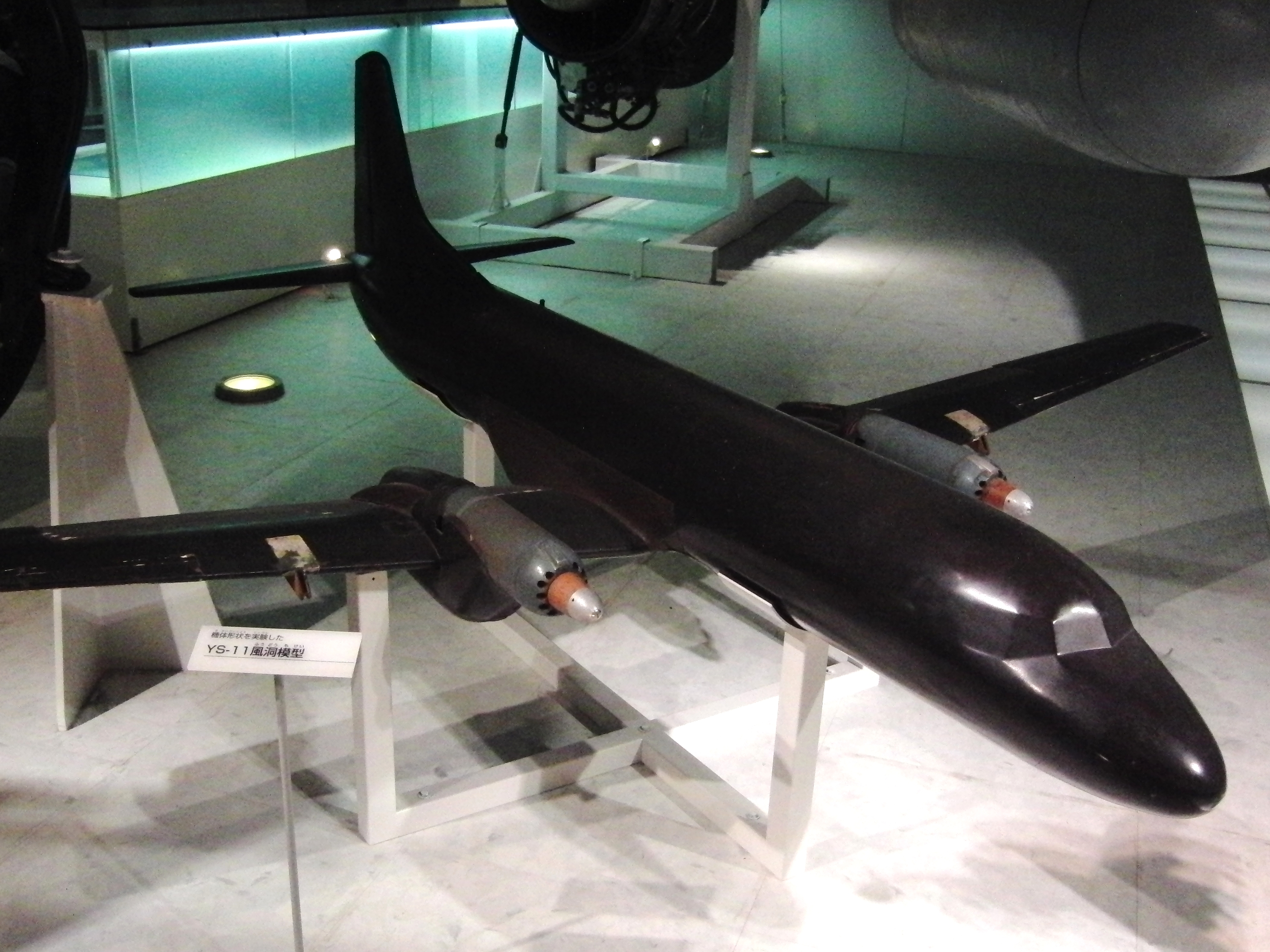
NAMC YS-11 wind tunnel model

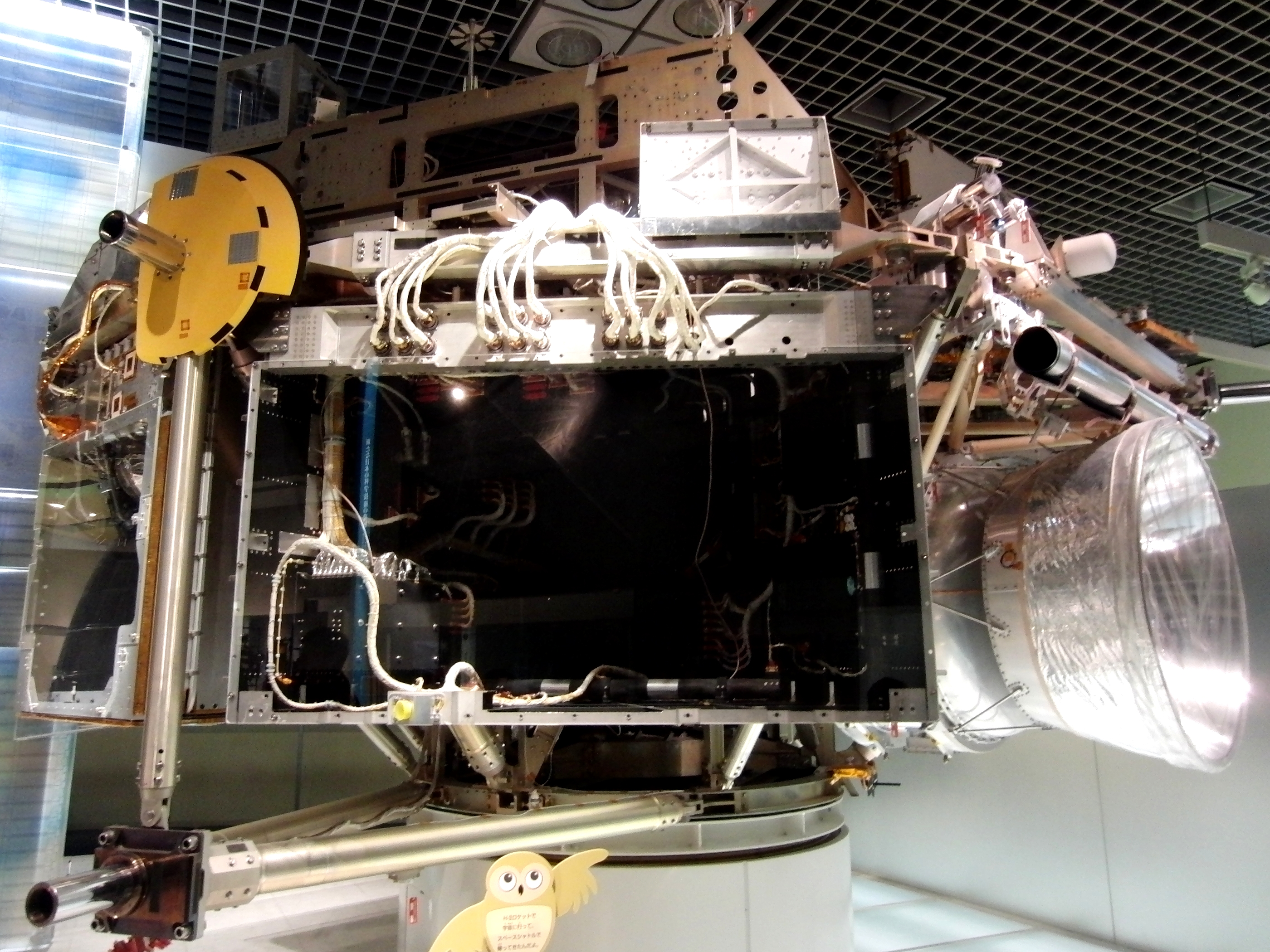
Space Flyer Unit

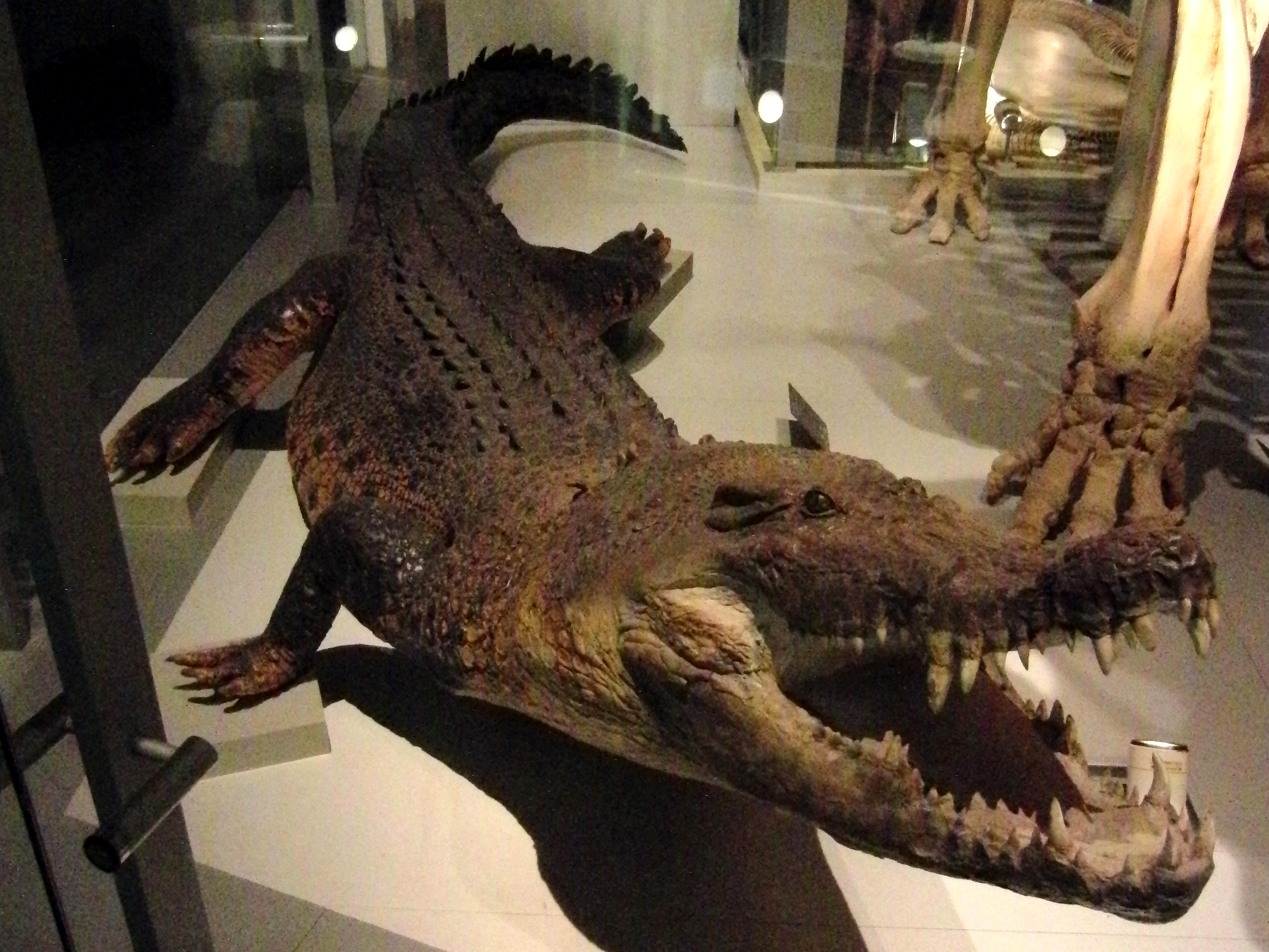
Saltwater crocodile

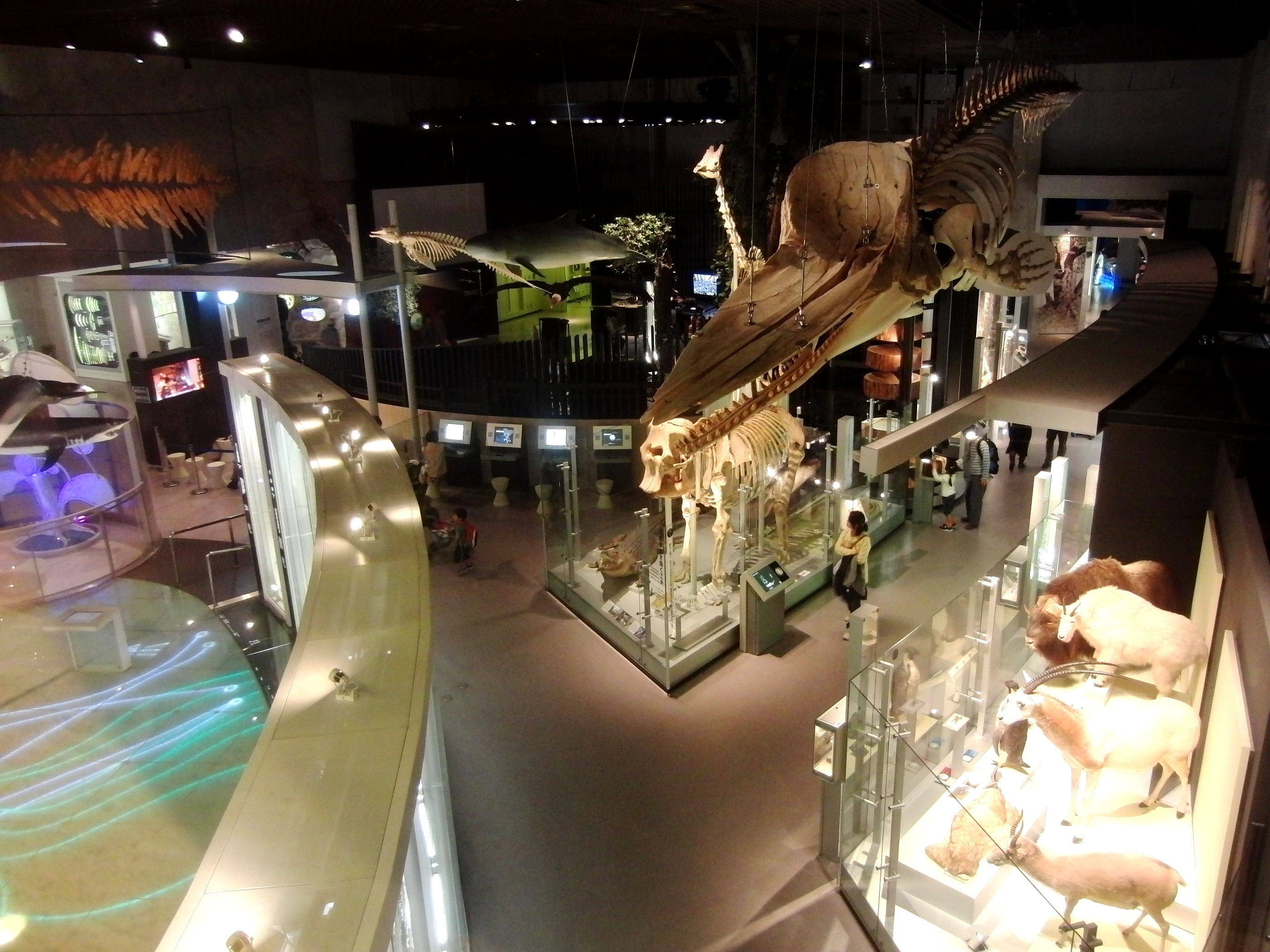
Skeleton of sperm whale

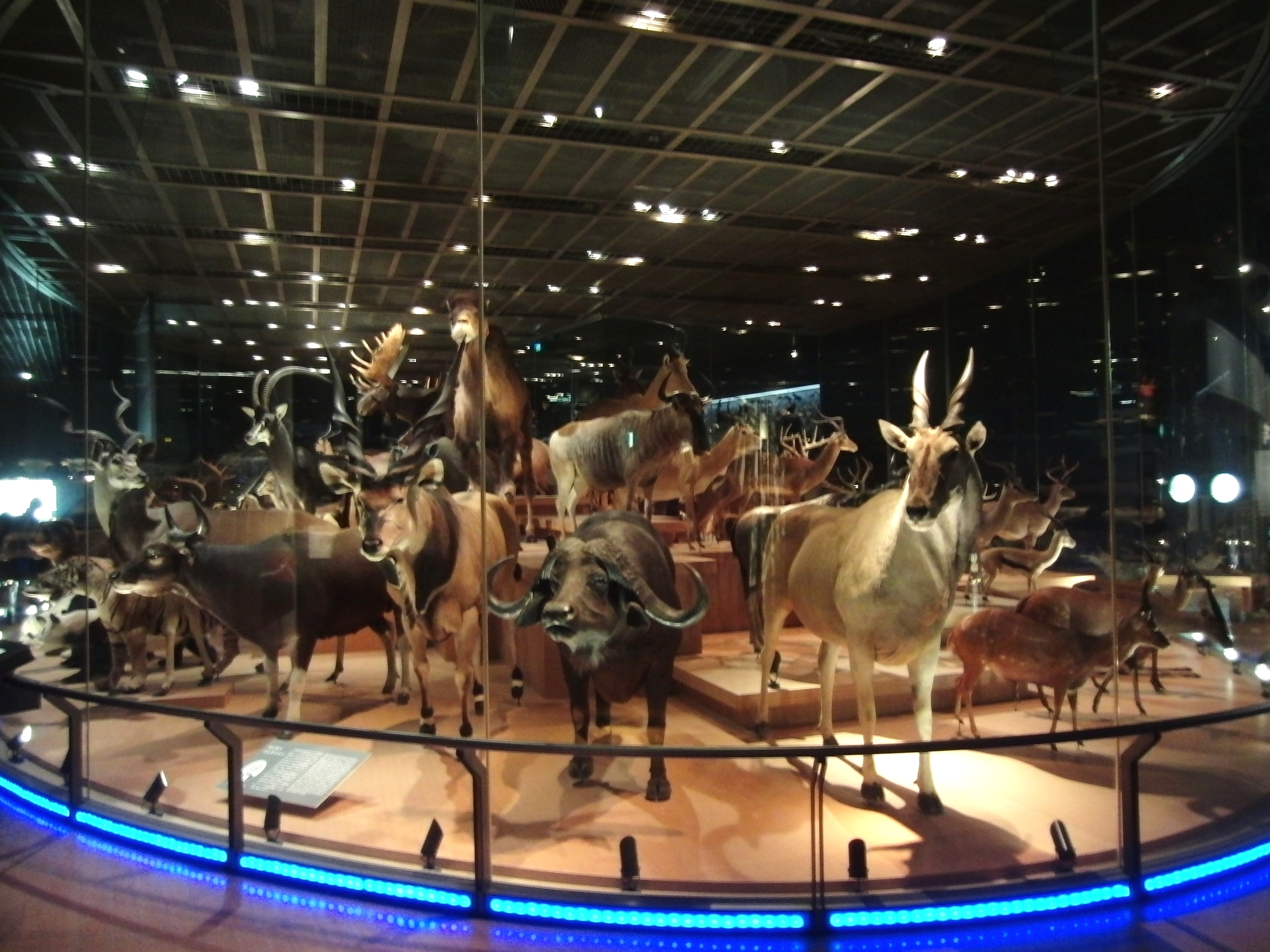
Animal collection

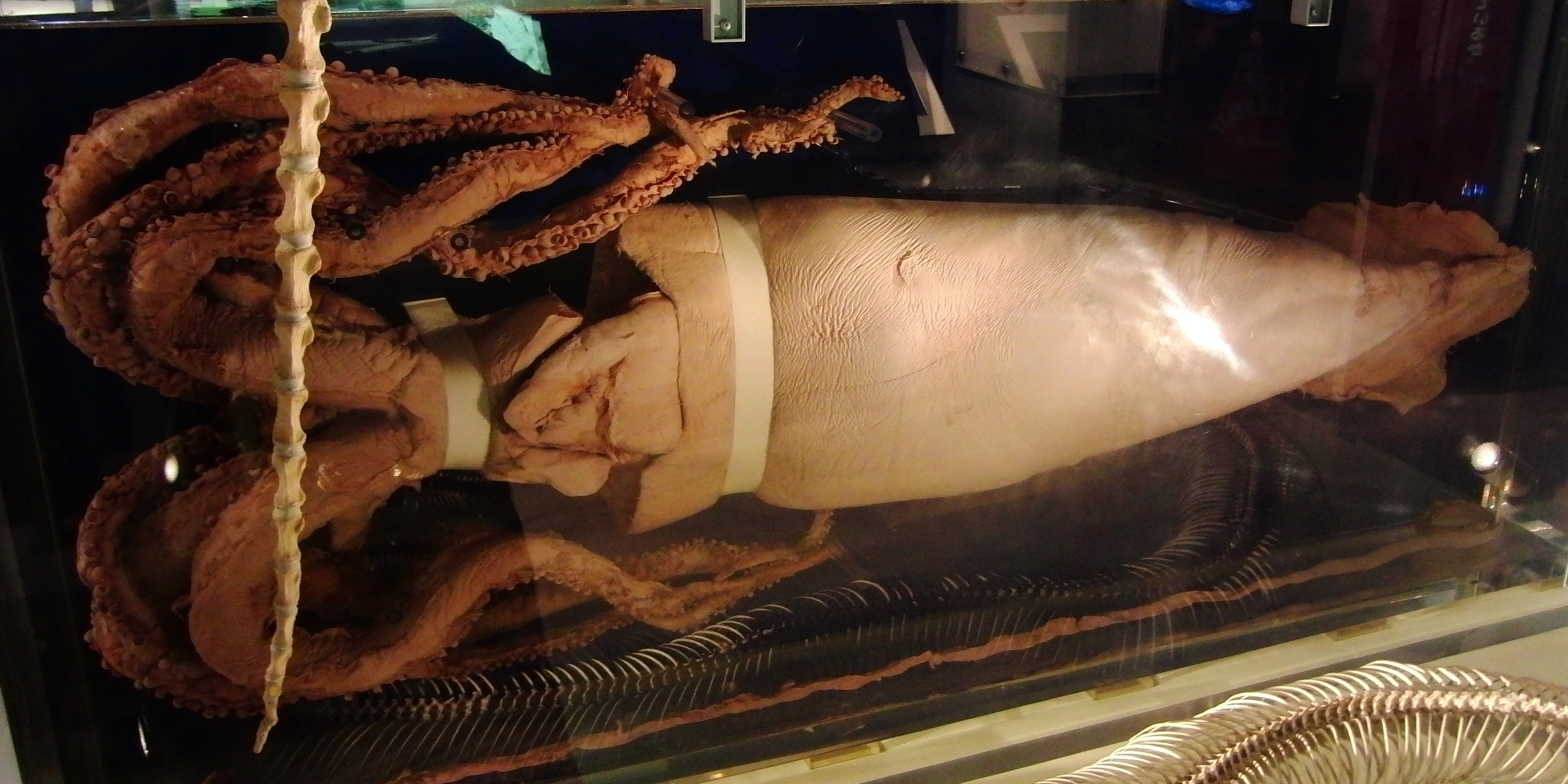
Specimen of giant squid

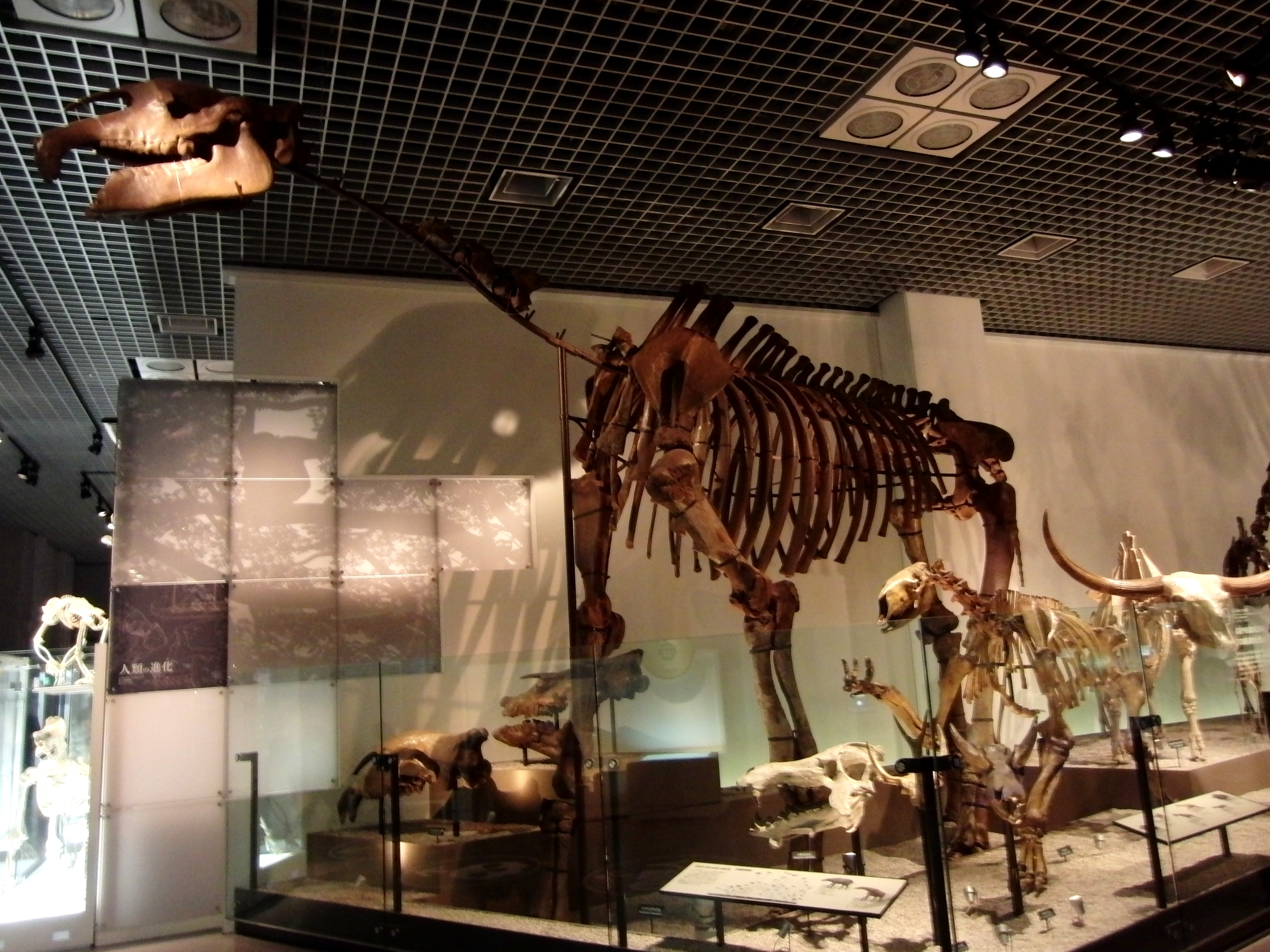
Paraceratherium

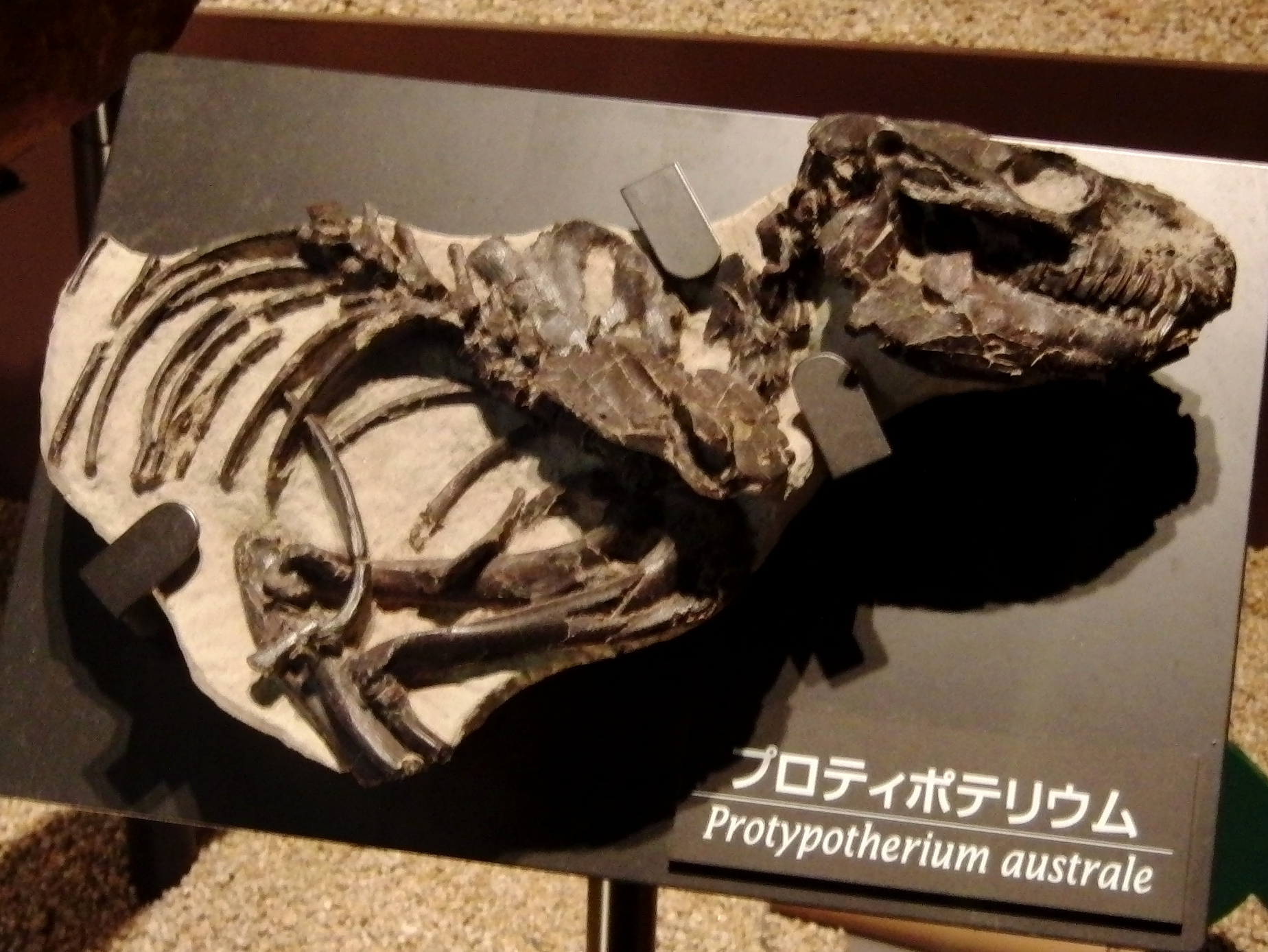
Protypotherium

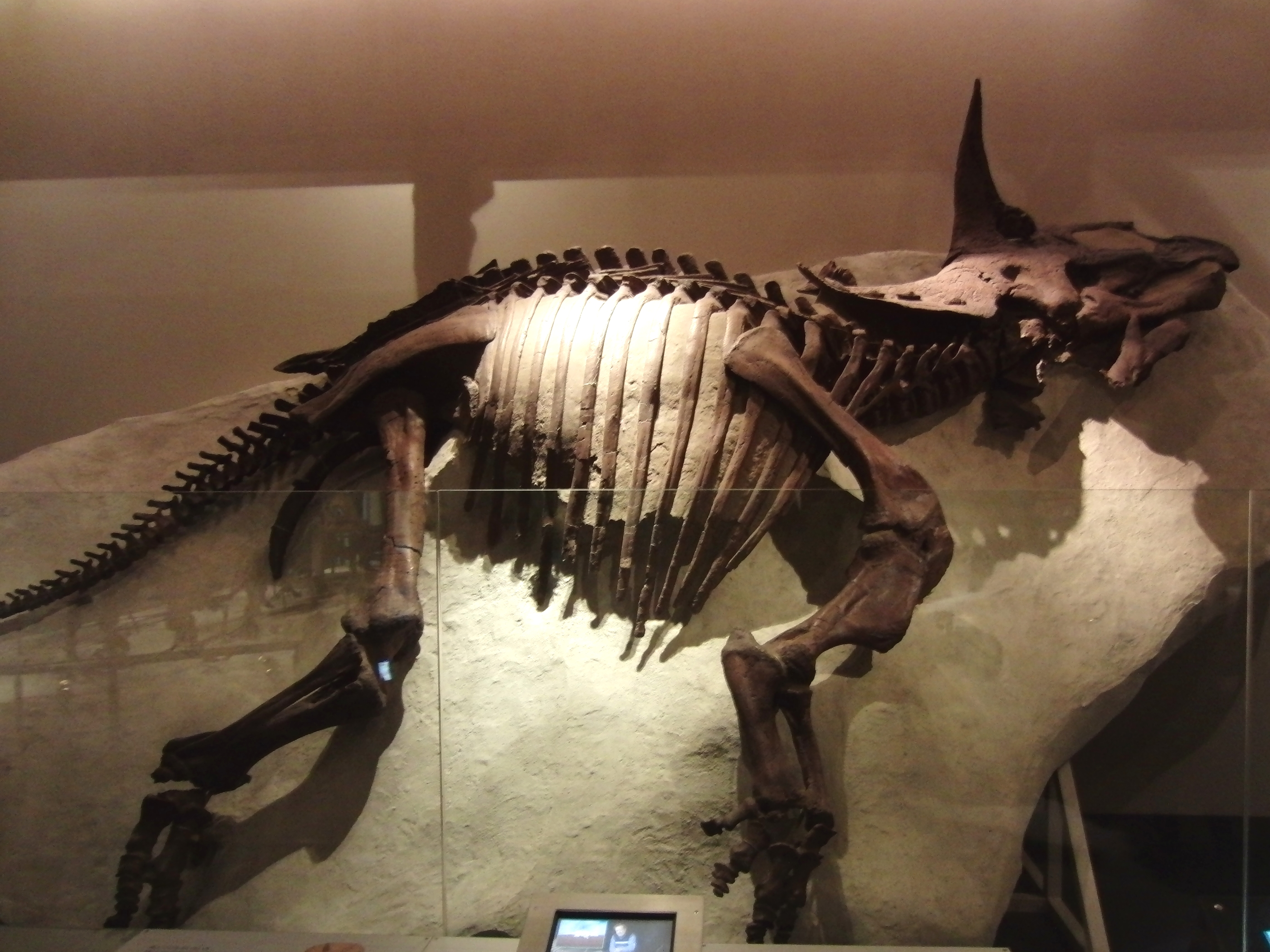
Fossil of Triceratops named "Raymond"

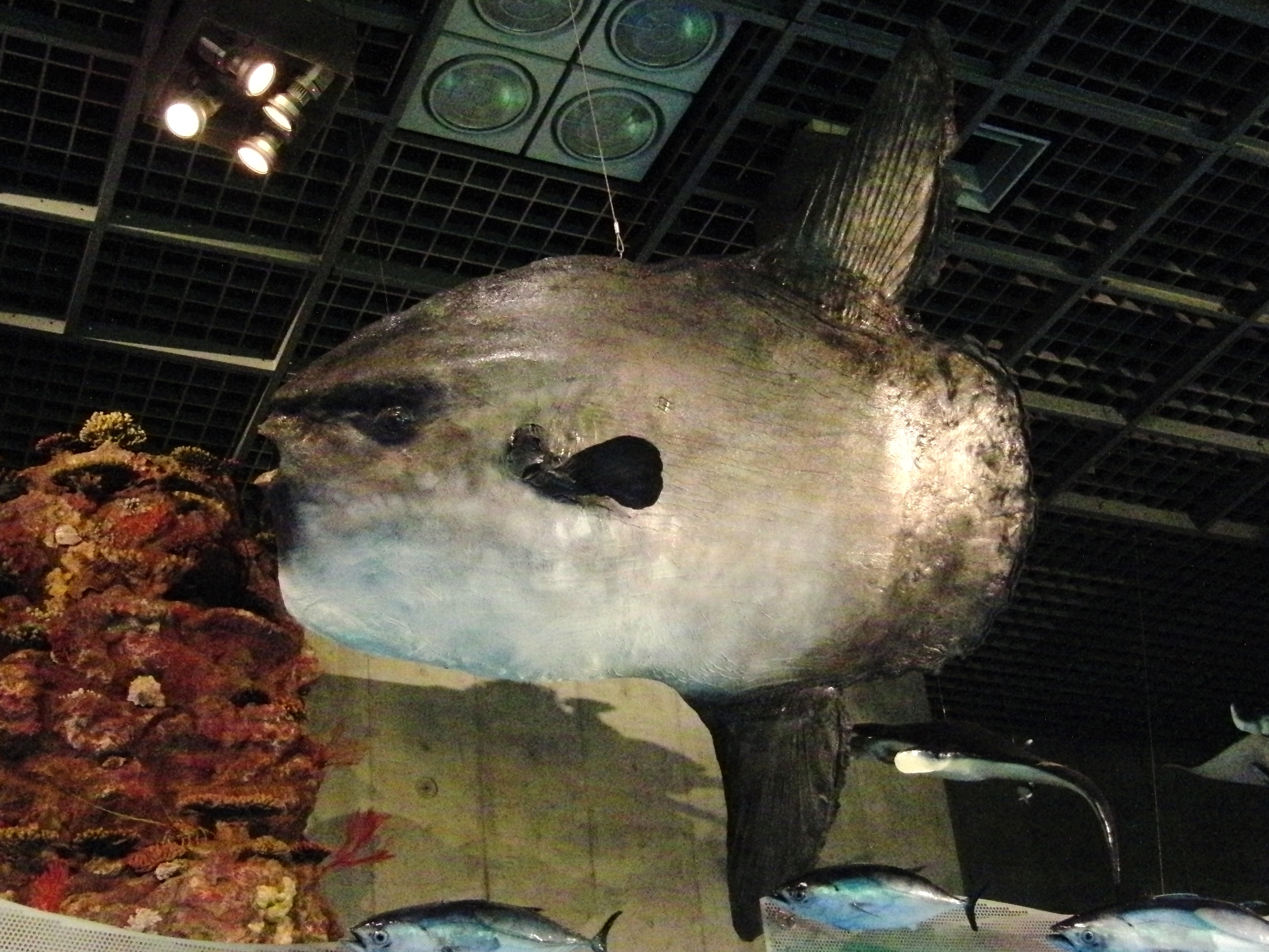
Largest taxidermy of Mola mola

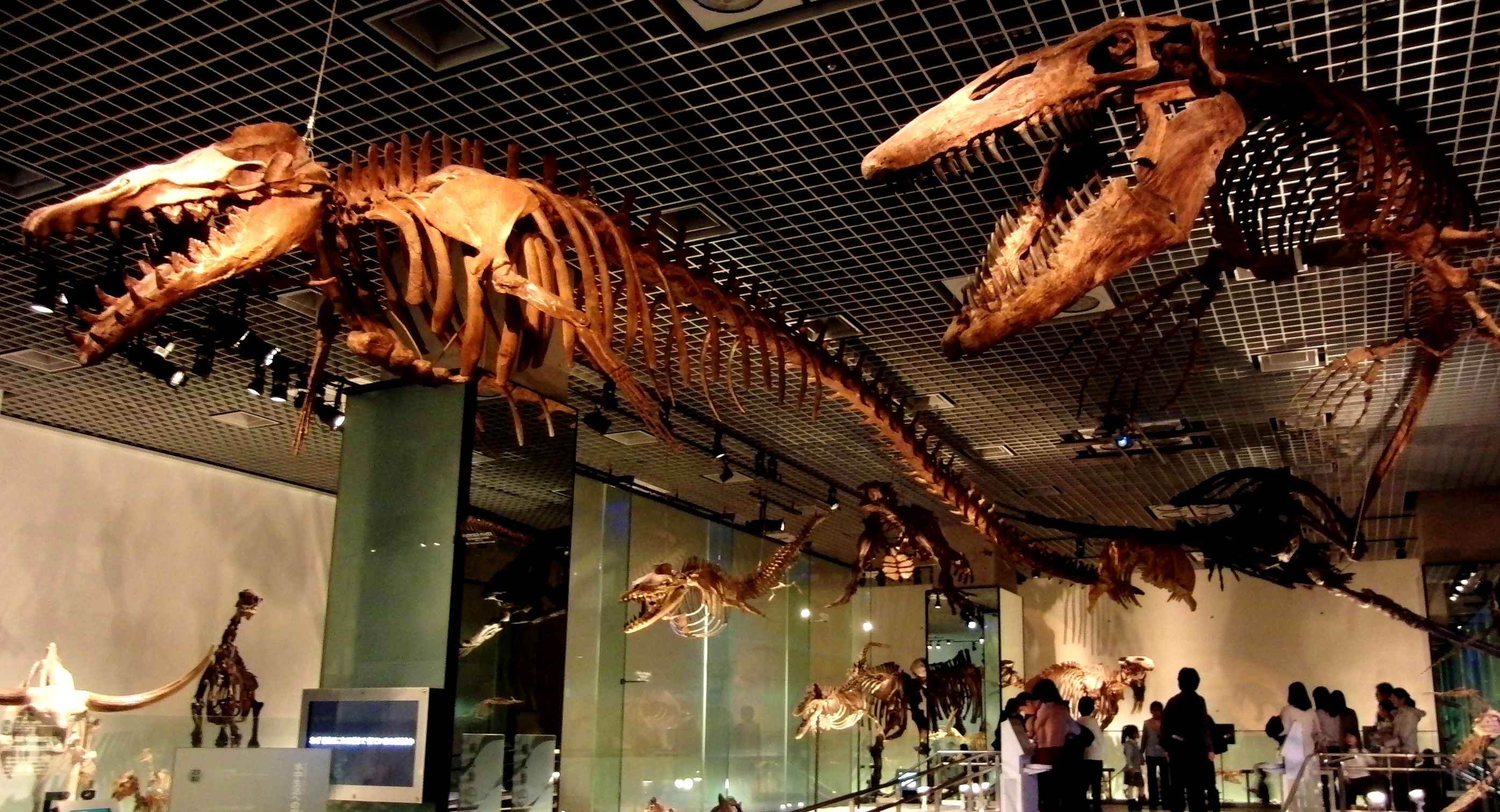
Basilosaurus and Tylosaurus

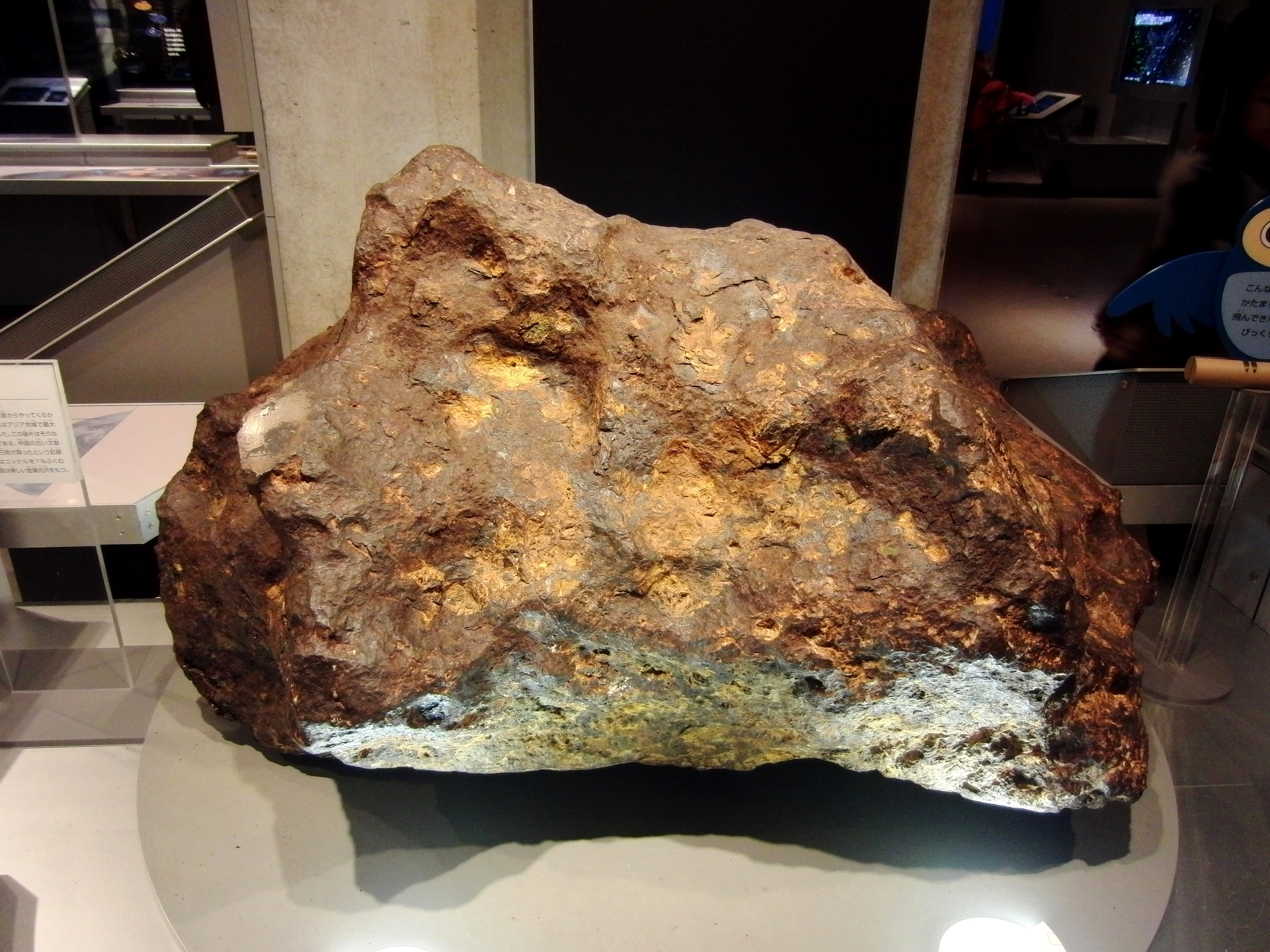
The largest fragment of Nantan meteorite

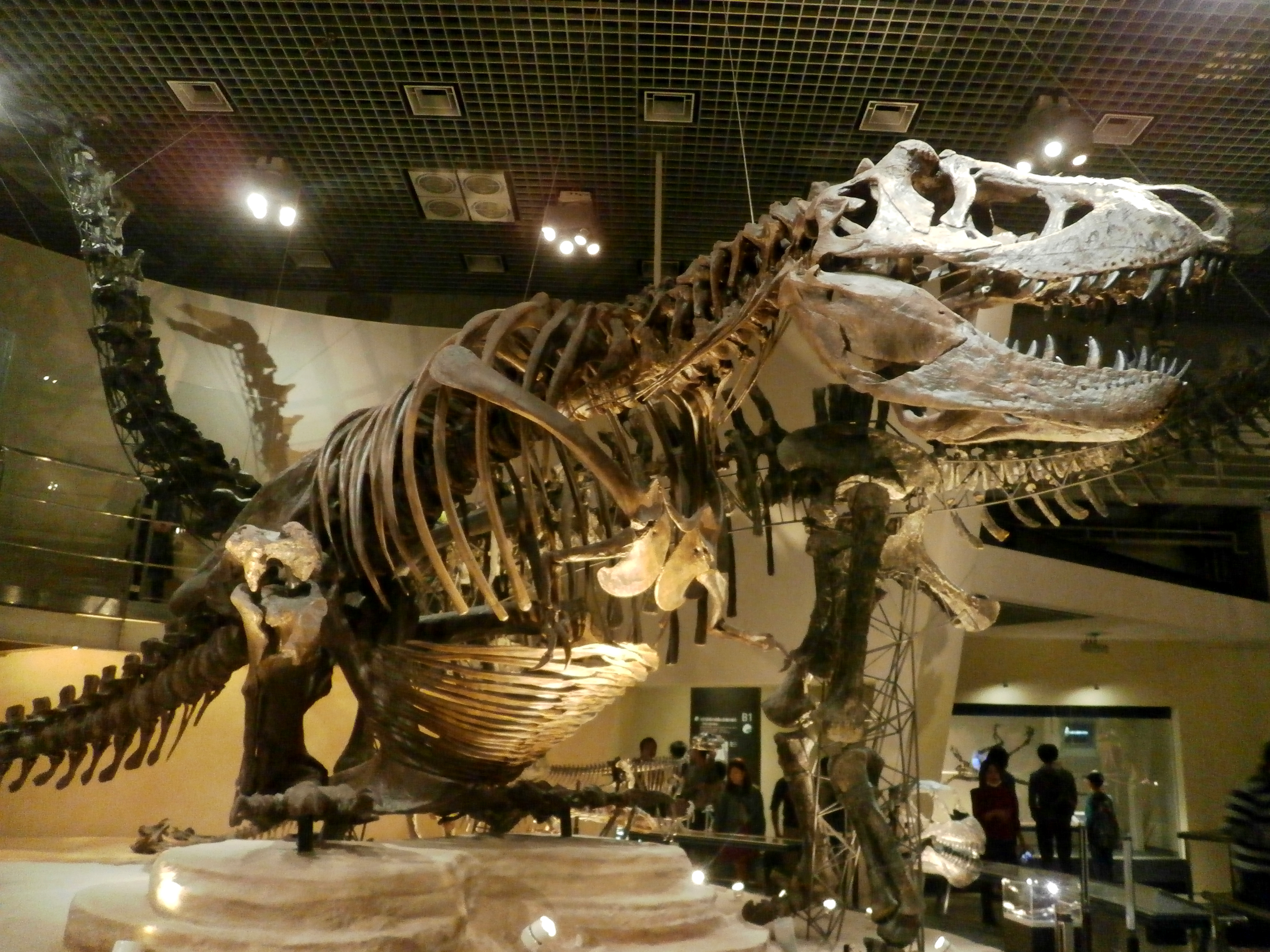
Tyrannosaurus rex

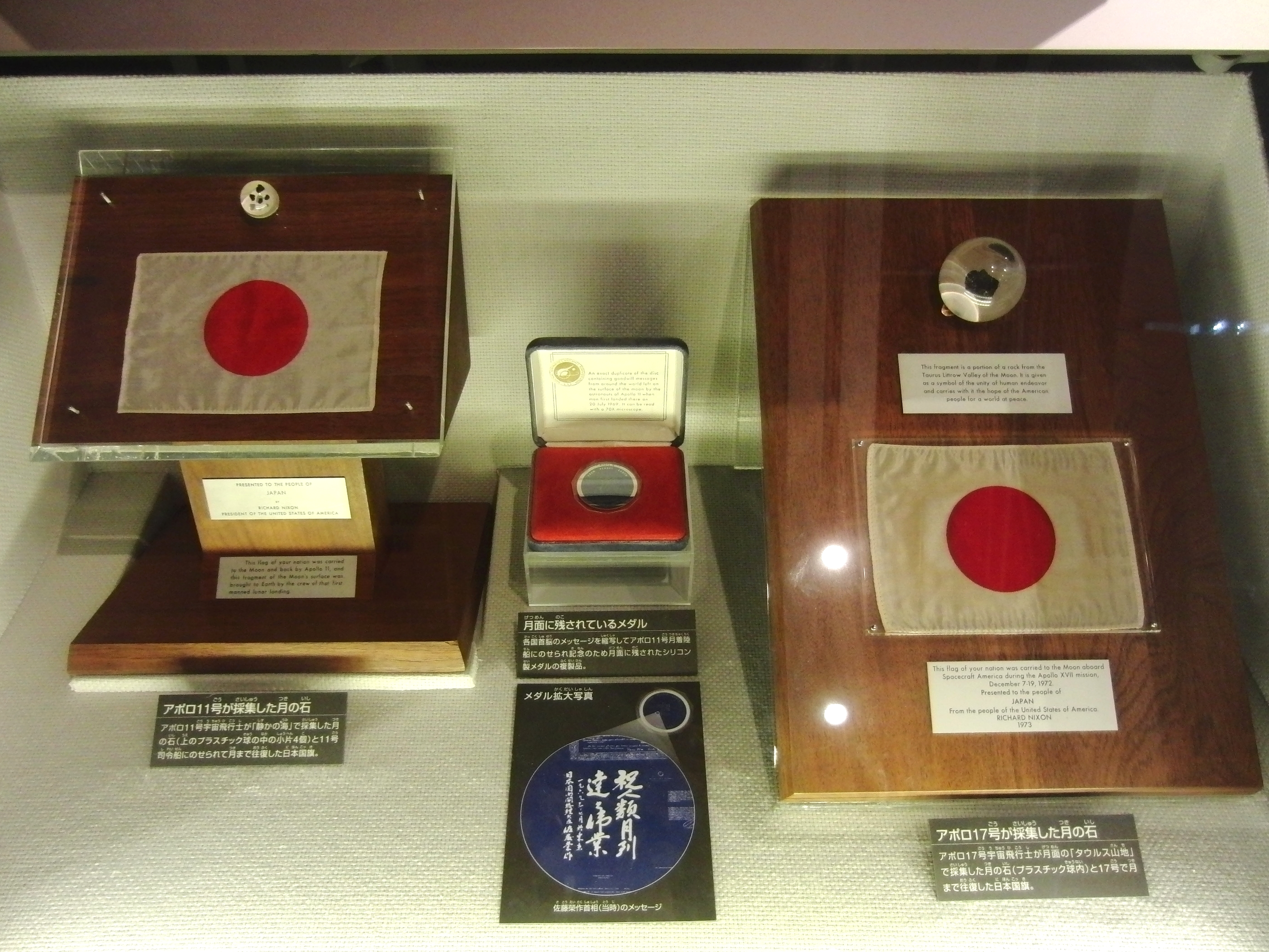
Moon rock

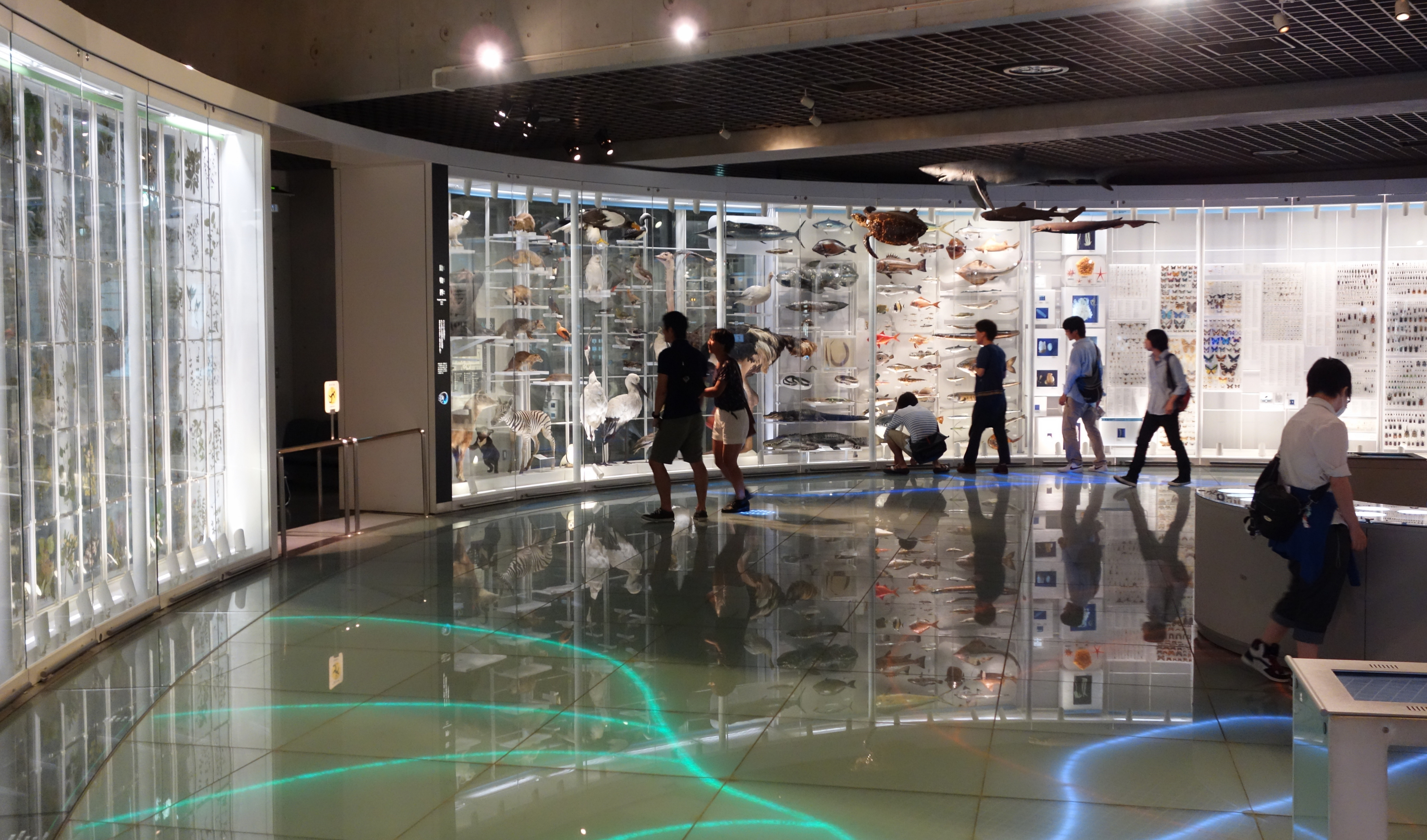
Taxidermy displays

== National research facility ==
Museum research facility

- Tsukuba Botanical Garden

Other National research facilities

- Ueno Zoo
- Tama Zoo
- Tokyo Sea Life Park

== Access ==
- Ueno Station
- Uguisudani Station
- Keisei Ueno Station

== See also ==
- Institute for Nature Study
- Hachikō
- List of museums
- National Science Museum (disambiguation)
- Tokyo National Museum
- Hisako Koyama
