= Ueno (disambiguation) =

Ueno ([ɯ̈̀.é̞.nó̞]) is a neighborhood in Taito, Tokyo.

Ueno may also refer to:

== Places ==
- Ueno, Mie, a former city in Mie Prefecture, now part of the city of Iga
- Ueno, Gunma, a village in Gunma Prefecture
- Ueno, Okinawa, a village in Okinawa Prefecture

== Other uses ==
- Ueno (surname) ([ɯ̈́.è̞.nò̞])
- Ueno bank, a former bank headquartered in Asunción, Paraguay
- Ueno Park, a public park in the Ueno district of Taitō, Tokyo
- Ueno Station, a major railway station in Tokyo's Taitō ward
- Ueno Zoo, a zoo located in Taitō, Tokyo
  - Ueno Zoo Monorail, a long suspended railway in the Ueno Zoo, Taitō, Tokyo
- Ueno, a creative technology services company founded by Icelandic businessman Haraldur Ingi Þorleifsson and sold to Twitter.
