= The Nature of the Beasts =

2013 non-fiction book by Ian Jared Miller

The Nature of the Beasts:Empire and Exhibition at the Tokyo Imperial Zoo
- Author: Ian Jared Miller
- Publisher: University of California Press
- Publication date: 2013

The Nature of the Beasts: Empire and Exhibition at the Tokyo Imperial Zoo is a non-fiction book about the history of zoo animals in Japan. It was written by Ian Jared Miller with a foreword by Harriet Ritvo. It was published in 2013 by University of California Press.

== Summary ==
The book is divided into three sections, each with two chapters. The first section "The Nature of Civilization", covers the understanding of nature in nineteenth century Japanese society, and the establishment and initial growth of the Ueno Imperial Zoo, including the development of its "war exhibition", made animals acquired during the First Sino-Japanese War, as well as horses or mules used by Japanese soldiers during the conflicts. The second section, "The Culture of Total War", describes the changes in zoos during World War II and the Second Sino-Japanese War, as well as the mass slaughter of large zoo animals in Tokyo. The fourth chapter in particular describes the events at Ueno Zoo where the animals killed mostly via strychnine and three elephants, Tonki, Hanako, and John, were starved or shot to death. The final section, "After the Empire", covers the revitalization of Japan's zoos after the war, their popularity, and their new connection to children. Miller makes the argument that, in post-war Japan, "zoo animals and children were now given roles meant to illustrate the convergence of the postwar United States and occupied Japan". He goes on to describe individual mascot animals, such as Susie the chimpanzee, and the elephants Hanako and Indira, gifted to Ueno Zoo by Thailand and India, respectively. He also discusses the giant pandas Lan Lan and Kang Kang, whose presence at the zoo gave it an increase in popularity and visitors and sparked a "panda boom" that lasted to the early twenty-first century. Finally, he concludes with zoos in early 21st century Japan and the death of giant pandas Ri Ri's and Shin Shin's six-day old cub.

== General references ==
- Kinder, John M. (2014-07-01). "The Nature of the Beasts: Empire and Exhibition at the Tokyo Imperial Zoo . By Ian Jared Miller. Berkeley: University of California Press, 2013. 360 pp. Illustrations, notes, bibliography, and index. Cloth $65.00". Environmental History. 19 (3): 573–574. doi:10.1093/envhis/emu047. ISSN 1084-5453.
- Ambros, Barbara (2016). "Review of The Nature of the Beasts: Empire and Exhibition at the Tokyo Imperial Zoo, MillerIan Jared". East Asian Science, Technology, and Medicine (43): 159–163. doi:10.1163/26669323-04301008. ISSN 1562-918X. JSTOR 90006248.
- Aso, Noriko (2015). "Review of The Nature of the Beasts: Empire and Exhibition at the Tokyo Imperial Zoo". Comparative Studies in Society and History. 57 (3): 871–872. doi:10.1017/S0010417515000328. ISSN 0010-4175. JSTOR 43908375.
- Bartholomew, James R. (2015). "Review of The Nature of the Beasts: Empire and Exhibition at the Tokyo Imperial Zoo". The Journal of Japanese Studies. 41 (1): 158–162. doi:10.1353/jjs.2015.0013. ISSN 0095-6848. JSTOR 24242654.
- Chaiklin, Martha (2015). "Review of The Nature of the Beasts: Empire and Exhibition at the Tokyo Imperial Zoo". Monumenta Nipponica. 70 (2): 329–331. doi:10.1353/mni.2015.0020. ISSN 0027-0741. JSTOR 43864699.
- Cincinnati, Noah (2015). "Review of THE NATURE OF THE BEASTS: Empire and Exhibition at the Tokyo Imperial Zoo. Asia: Local Studies/Global Themes, 27". Pacific Affairs. 88 (1): 200–202. ISSN 0030-851X. JSTOR 43591086.
- Donahue, Jesse (2014). "Review of The Nature of the Beasts: Empire and Exhibition at the Tokyo Imperial Zoo. (Asia: Local Studies/Global Themes, no. 27)". The American Historical Review. 119 (4): 1243. doi:10.1093/ahr/119.4.1243. ISSN 0002-8762. JSTOR 43695919.
- Kinder, John M. (2014). "Review of The Nature of the Beasts: Empire and Exhibition at the Tokyo Imperial Zoo". Environmental History. 19 (3): 573–574. doi:10.1093/envhis/emu047. ISSN 1084-5453. JSTOR 24690608.
- Low, Morris (September 2014). "Ian Jared Miller; Harriet Ritvo. The Nature of the Beasts: Empire and Exhibition at the Tokyo Imperial Zoo". Isis. 105 (3): 656–657. doi:10.1086/679160. ISSN 0021-1753.
- Onaga, Lisa (2015). "The Nature of the Beasts: Empire and Exhibition at the Tokyo Imperial Zoo by Ian Jared Miller (review)". East Asian Science, Technology and Society. 9 (2): 225–227. doi:10.1215/18752160-2868559. ISSN 1875-2152.
- Vollmer, Klaus (2015). "Review of The Nature of the Beasts: Empire and Exhibition at the Tokyo Imperial Zoo". The Journal of Asian Studies. 74 (3): 754–756. doi:10.1017/S0021911815000832. ISSN 0021-9118. JSTOR 43552781.
- Webb, Thomas (2017). "Review of The Nature of the Beasts: Empire and Exhibition at the Tokyo Imperial Zoo". Environment and History. 23 (3): 479–480. doi:10.3197/096734017X14979473873920. ISSN 0967-3407. JSTOR 26401740.
