= Shin Shin =

Shin Shin may refer to:

- Mitsubishi X-2 Shinshin, Japanese stealth aircraft
- Pyotr Nikolaitch Shinshin, a minor character in the book War and Peace
- Shin Shin Department Store, a shopping center in Taipei, Taiwan
- Shin Shin (giant panda)
