= Future Mind =

- Industry: Information technology; Consulting firm
- Founded: 2008
- Founder: Tomasz Woźniak; Tomasz Koperski; Paweł Josiek
- Key people: Tomasz Koperski (CEO)
- Website: futuremind.com

Future Mind, a part of the Solita Group, is a consulting and technology company founded in 2008 that develops digital products. The company's team consists of over 220 specialists, including business and technology consultants, analysts, software developers, UX/UI designers, and data engineers. Future Mind supports brands in digital change management as well as the development and maintenance of digital products. In its projects, the company combines mobile and backend technologies with cloud, data, and AI solutions.

== History ==
=== Early web services ===
Future Mind is a Polish IT company founded in 2008 in Warsaw as a special purpose entity to develop a social media startup. Commercial operations providing software development services to clients were launched in 2011 and expanded by its partners: Tomasz Woźniak (CEO), Tomasz Koperski (CTO), and Paweł Josiek (COO). During its early years, the company collaborated on developing mobile applications for popular Polish websites, including Demotywatory.pl, Kwejk.pl, and Synonymy.pl. It also developed its own products, such as eLOT — an application used for selling airline tickets.

=== Focusing on mobile app development ===
The company gradually pivoted toward mobile application development. Its projects included Envelo for the Polish Post (which received a nomination for the Mobile Trends Award in 2015), an application for the mobile network operator Virgin Mobile, and QuizHouse — an app downloaded over one million times, developed for the creators of the YouTube channel "Matura to Bzdura".

A significant milestone for the company was the partnership established with Żabka in 2017, where Future Mind participated in developing the Żappka customer app and Frappka, an internal application for franchisees.

Released in 2019, the Żappka application featured a loyalty program, personalized offers, and promotions. It quickly became one of the most popular apps in Poland. In this project, Future Mind collaborated with Synerise and the design studio Ueno, known for its work with companies such as Uber and Airbnb.

During the period of increased interest in e-commerce and mobile commerce driven by the COVID-19 pandemic, Future Mind continued its growth in mobile app development and supported enterprises through digital transformation processes. During this time, the company established partnerships with brands such as LPP, Hebe, and Super-Pharm.

=== Consulting expansion and rebranding ===
In June 2022, Future Mind underwent a rebranding process. This included updating its corporate visual identity and communication strategy to support the company's international expansion plans. The new visual identity was designed in collaboration with 247 Studio, known for its projects for brands such as Adidas and Interia. The rebranding was part of a broader strategy, aimed at increasing the company's visibility in international markets — including Western Europe, where Future Mind established partnerships with global brands such as YouGov and D-Marin.

The new visual identity was intended to reflect the company's modern approach to developing digital products. As part of the rebranding, a new website was launched. Due to the growth of its Advisory line and digital transformation projects, the company wanted its communication to reflect its changing business. This meant moving away from being seen only as a mobile app developer.

=== Acquisition by Solita and further development ===
In November 2023, the Finnish technology company Solita acquired the Polish company Future Mind. Through this deal, Solita entered the Polish market and expanded its operations in Europe. Future Mind became part of the Solita Group, which employs over 2,000 specialists across Europe. The founders of Future Mind — Tomasz Woźniak, Tomasz Koperski, and Paweł Josiek — remained in management positions and became shareholders of Solita. The acquisition was part of Solita's expansion strategy.

The merger of Solita and Future Mind led to the opening of the Solita Poland Centre of Excellence. Based in Warsaw and Tychy, the center launched in April 2024. It focuses on data analytics, artificial intelligence, and system integration. Solita Poland operates in an EU-shoring model, providing services that meet European Union standards. The company actively recruits specialists and offers opportunities to work on international projects for clients such as Pfizer, NATO, and Biedronka.

The partnership combined the expertise of Future Mind and Solita to create technological solutions on a European scale. Future Mind used Solita's international experience in data management and artificial intelligence to bring Nordic market's know-how to Poland, where local businesses could benefit from their higher level of digital advancement.

In October 2025, Future Mind announced a change in the CEO position. Tomasz Woźniak, who had led the company for seventeen years, handed over his duties to the former CTO, Tomasz Koperski. At the same time, Koperski became Executive Vice President (EVP) of the Solita Group. Woźniak remained involved with the company by joining Future Mind's supervisory board and taking on the role of Strategic Advisor for the entire group. This transition was part of the integration strategy with Solita, aimed at strengthening the company's position in the tech market, especially in artificial intelligence.

In 2025, Future Mind launched its software framework, Atlas, which accelerates m-commerce app development, reduces project complexity, and ensures cost predictability. The framework includes ready-to-use UI components, allowing developers to focus on unique application features. Atlas also supports the secure use of GenAI tools while providing clean, modular code that minimizes the risk of technical debt.

== Awards and recognition ==
The most notable awards and recognitions received by the company include:

- Financial Times 1000 (2020): Future Mind was included in the ranking of Europe's fastest-growing companies published by the British daily Financial Times.
- Forbes Diamonds (2020): The company received the award, ranking 18th on the regional list and 79th nationally in Poland.
- Deloitte Technology – Fast 50 Central Europe (2022): Future Mind was recognized among the fastest-growing technology companies in Central Europe.
- Forbes Diamonds (2025): The company was awarded a Forbes Diamond for the second time.
- Forbes Diamonds (2026): The company ranked 384th on the regional list and 1,434th on the national list.

Other recognitions:

- 2015: Mobile Trends Award nomination for the Envelo application.
- 2018: Mobile Trends Awards — Main Prize (1st place) for the Frappka application for Franchisees.
- 2018: Mobile Trends Awards — Award in the For Companies category, for the "Frappka Application for Franchisees".
- 2019: Mobile Trends Awards — Main Prize (3rd place) for the Żappka application (developed in collaboration with Synerise).
- 2019: Mobile Trends Awards — Award in the Commerce / M-Commerce category, for the Żappka application (developed in collaboration with Synerise).
- 2020: Mobile Trends Awards — Award in the Commerce category, for the Hebe application.
- 2022: Mobile Trends Awards — Main Prize (1st place) for the Sinsay application (developed in collaboration with Silky Coders).
- 2022: Mobile Trends Awards — Award in the Mobile-Based Business Solution category, for the Asystent Żabka application.
- 2022: Mobile Trends Awards — Award in the M-commerce category, for the Sinsay application (developed in collaboration with Silky Coders).
- 2024: Mobile Trends Awards — Award in the Commerce category, for TIM.
- Nomination for the 2023 Mobile Trends Award for the Reserved app; developed by Silky Coders and Future Mind
- Nomination for the 2023 Mobile Trends Award for the eobuwie.pl app; developed by Modivo and Future Mind
- Nomination for the 2023 Mobile Trends Award for the Hebe app; developed by Future Mind
- Nomination for the 2023 Mobile Trends Award for the D-Marin app; developed by Future Mind
- Nomination for the 2025 Mobile Trends Award for the Biedronka app; developed by Future Mind
- Nomination for the 2025 Mobile Trends Award for the Big Star app; developed by Future Mind
- Nomination for the 2025 Mobile Trends Award for the AirHelp app; developed by Future Mind
- 2021: e-Commerce Polska Awards — Award in the Best on Mobile category, for the Hebe application.
- 2022: e-Commerce Polska Awards — two recognitions: Grand Prix, and the Award in the M-commerce category, for LPP's Sinsay mobile application (developed in collaboration with Silky Coders).
- 2022: e-Commerce Polska Awards — Award in the Mobile-Based Business Solution category, for the Asystent Żabka application.
- 2022: e-Commerce Polska Awards — Special Award in the M-commerce category, for digital accessibility for the Hebe mobile application.
- 2024: Ways Awards — 1st place in the Website category, for the redesign of the Orange Flex website.
- 2026: Ways Awards — 1st place in the Mobile App category, and the Audience Award, for the Pepco mobile app
- 2020: Clutch Awards — recognition in the Top App Development Companies in Poland ranking
- 2021: Clutch Awards — recognition in the Top Development Companies in Poland ranking
