= Xiang Xiang (giant panda, born 2017) =

Giant panda (born 2017)

Xiang Xiang 香香
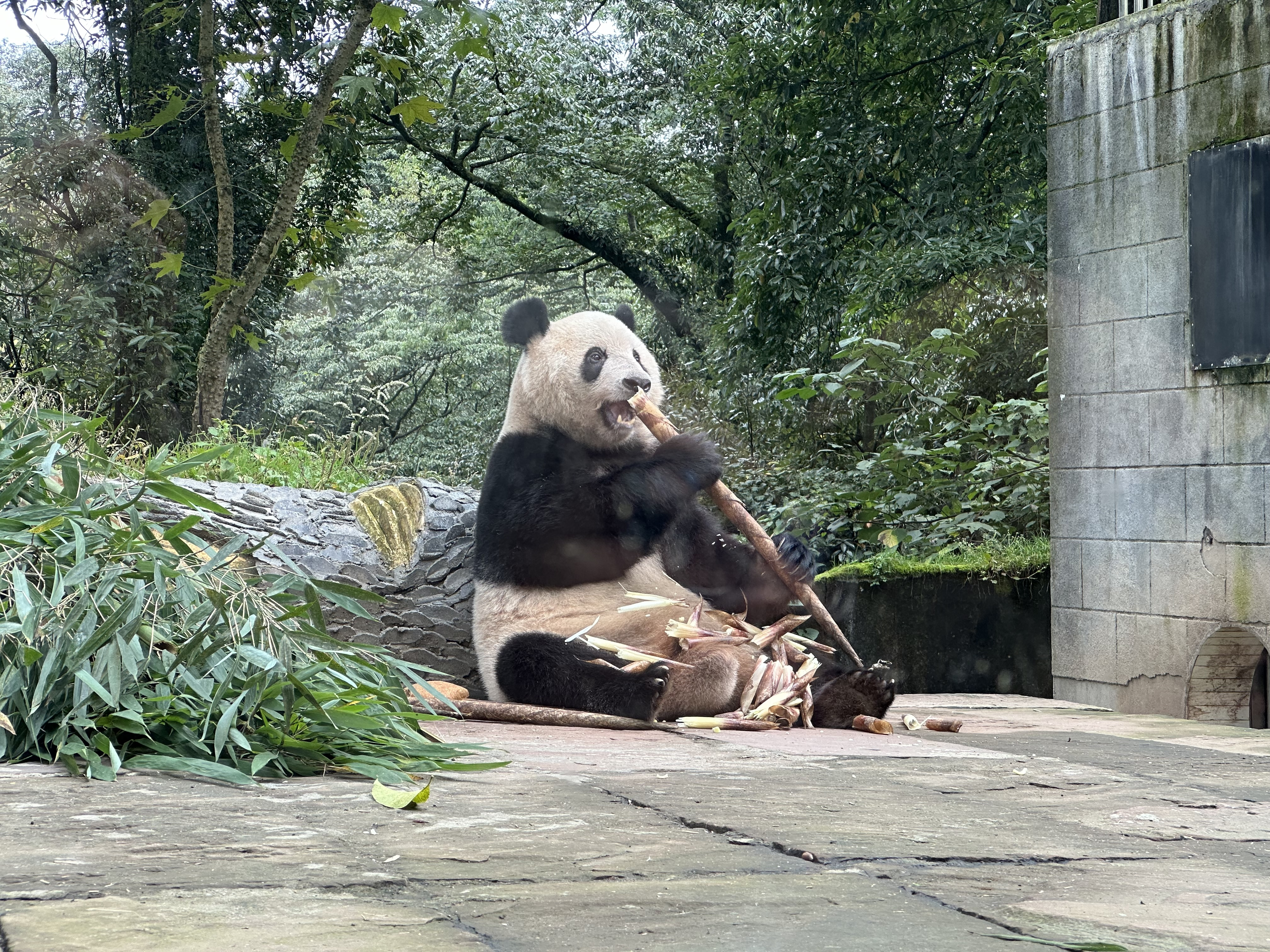
- Xiang Xiang at Ya'an Panda Base, 2023
- Species: Giant panda
- Sex: Female
- Born: June 12, 2017 (age 9); Ueno Zoo, Japan
- Parent: Ri Ri and Shin Shin

Xiang Xiang (Chinese: 香香; pinyin: Xiāng Xiāng, "Popular"; born June 12, 2017) is a female giant panda born through natural mating in the Ueno Zoo in Japan. Her parents are Ri Ri and Shin Shin. She is the first panda to have been born at the Zoo since You You.

After her deadline to return to China was extended five times due to her popularity in Japan and the COVID-19 pandemic, she returned on February 21, 2023, and lives in Ya'an, Sichuan.

== Life ==
Xiang Xiang was born on June 12, 2017, at the Ueno Zoo to Ri Ri and Shin Shin via natural mating. Her parents arrived in Japan six years prior to her birth as part of a panda diplomacy with China. She is the younger sister of an unnamed male cub, who was born on July 5, 2012, and died six days later from pneumonia. Xiang Xiang's Chinese name means "popular".

Xiang Xiang was the first giant panda at the zoo to be born through natural mating and survive into adulthood since You You (male; born June 23, 1988). It was revealed during a physical examination on June 22, 2017, that Xiang Xiang is female. On September 20, another physical examination of Xiang Xiang showed that she was growing well, weighing 6 kg and measuring 65 cm in length. Xiang Xiang and her mother Shin Shin were shown to the public on December 19. At the time of her debut, public viewing of the mother and cub was conducted via a lottery system; there were as many as 250,000 applications in 2017 alone, and the odds for the first weekend of public viewing on December 23 were 144 to 1.

=== Return to China ===
Xiang Xiang, Ri Ri and Shin Shin, who were on loan to the Tokyo Metropolitan Government from China, are considered Chinese property under the terms of the agreement. Although she was originally scheduled to be returned to China upon turning two years old, the return was postponed five times due to negotiations between Japan and China—driven by her popularity in Japan—and the subsequent COVID-19 pandemic. Prior to her departure, the Ueno Zoo ran an online program where people could say goodbye to Xiang Xiang, and the Zoo released videos of her on its official Twitter account.

Xiang Xiang was returned to China on February 21, 2023, and arrived at Chengdu Shuangliu International Airport in Sichuan Province that same evening. After arriving in China, Xiang Xiang was transferred to the Bifengxia Panda Base, and as of August 15, 2023, she has been living in Ya'an, Sichuan.

== See also ==
- List of individual giant pandas
- List of individual bears
