= You You =

Giant panda (1988–2004)

- Sex: Male
- Born: June 23, 1988; Ueno Zoo, Japan
- Died: March 2004; Beijing Zoo, China

You You (Chinese: 悠悠; June 23, 1988 - March 2004) was a male giant panda born by artificial insemination that lived at Ueno Zoo in Tokyo, Japan. His parents are Fei Fei and Huan Huan.

In 1992, to commemorate the 20th anniversary of the Normalization of Sino-Japan Diplomatic Relations, Ueno Zoo exchanged You You with Ling Ling from Beijing Zoo in China, and You You was moved to Beijing Zoo.

== Life ==
You You was born on June 23, 1988, via artificial insemination. He was the brother of Tong Tong. In March 2004, You You died at Beijing Zoo, aged 15.

== See also ==
- Ling Ling
- Panda diplomacy
- List of individual giant pandas
- List of individual bears
