= Ling Ling (giant panda) =

Chinese panda in Japan (1985–2008)

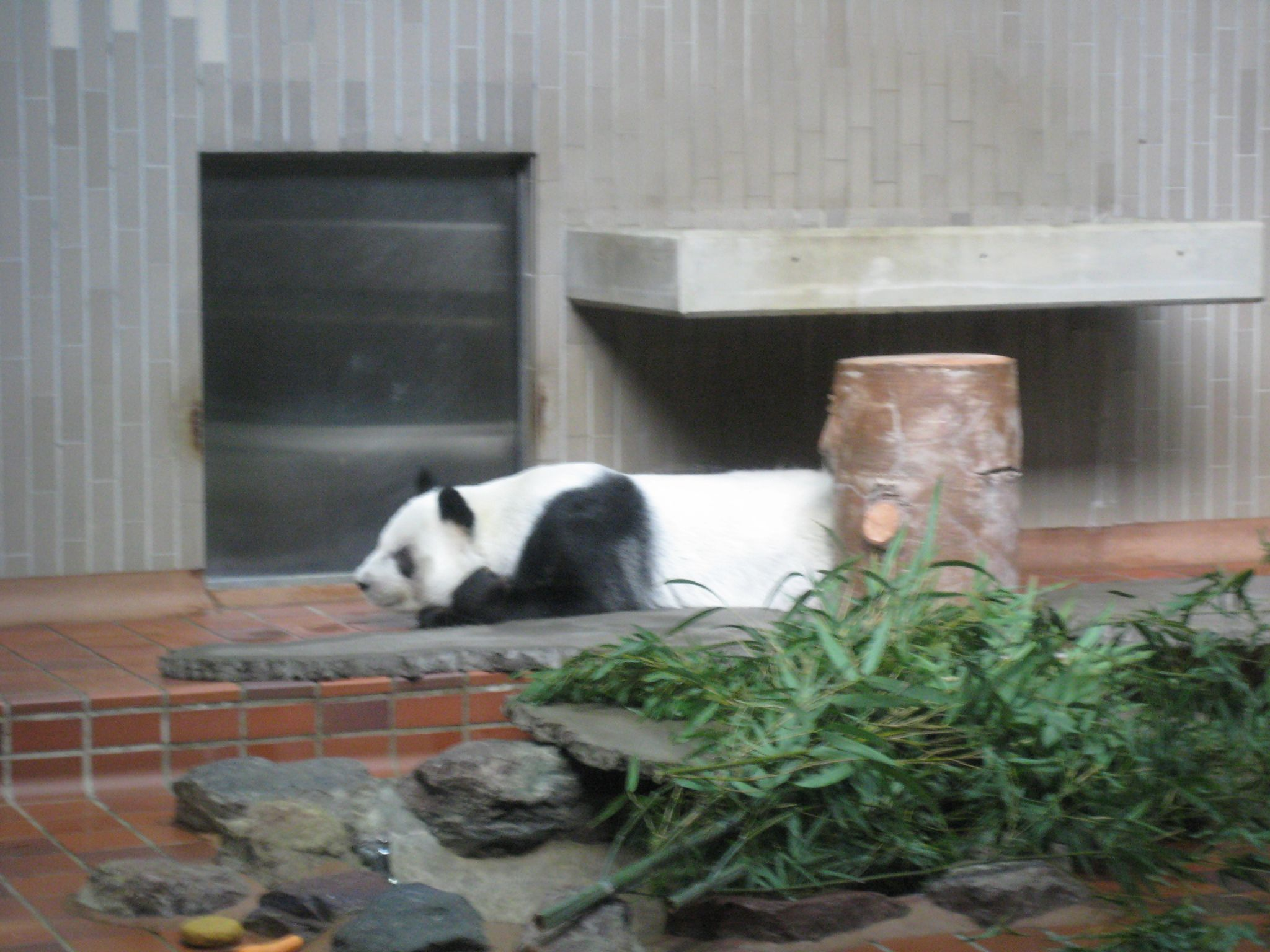
- Ling Ling at the Ueno Zoo in September 2007
- Other name: 陵陵
- Species: Giant panda
- Sex: Male
- Born: September 5, 1985; Beijing Zoo, China
- Died: April 30, 2008 (aged 22); Ueno Zoo, Japan
- Nationality: China
- Known for: Last panda owned by Japan

Ling Ling (陵陵; September 5, 1985 – April 30, 2008) was a male Chinese-born giant panda who resided at the Ueno Zoo, the largest zoo in Tokyo, Japan. At the time of his death at the age of 22, Ling Ling was the only giant panda at the Ueno Zoo and the oldest panda in Japan. He served as an important symbol of the Ueno Zoo and of friendship between Japan and China.

Ling Ling, who was given to Japan in 1992, was the only giant panda in the country who was directly owned by Japan. There are eight other giant pandas in Japan as of April 2008, but they are all on loan to Japan from China. Despite being a male panda, Ling Ling's name meant "darling little girl" in Chinese.

== Life ==
Ling Ling was born at Beijing Zoo in Beijing, China, on September 5, 1985. He was given to Japan and Tokyo's Ueno Zoo in November 1992 by China in exchange for a panda which had been born in Japan. The 1992 panda exchange between China and Japan, which is often called Panda diplomacy, took place to commemorate the 20th anniversary of the normalization of bilateral Sino-Japanese relations in 1972. He remained one of the Ueno Zoo's most popular attractions for over 15 years.

Ueno Zoo paired Ling Ling with a female panda named Tong Tong. The two pandas became mates, but were unable to breed successfully and produced no cubs. Tong Tong died in 2000, leaving Ling Ling as the only giant panda at Ueno Zoo. The zoo tried unsuccessfully to have Ling Ling breed with other pandas since 2001 using artificial insemination. Ling Ling was even sent out of Japan to Mexico's Chapultepec Zoo three times in an attempt to have him mate with other pandas, such as Xin Xin.

== Death ==
Ling Ling's health began to deteriorate in August 2007 due to old age, with symptoms such as loss of strength and appetite. He had been on medication since September 2007 for his ailments, which included heart and kidney problems. He was removed from public display at the zoo on April 29, 2008, at the beginning of the zoo's Golden Week holiday season. The zoo explained that Ling Ling would be removed from display in order to undergo intensive care treatments.

Despite the treatments, Ling Ling died at the Ueno Zoo at approximately 2 A.M. on April 30, 2008, just one day after he was withdrawn from public exhibition. A necropsy found that he had died of heart failure. He was 22 years, seven months, and five days old, which is roughly equivalent to 70 years old in human years. According to Ueno Zoo, Ling Ling was the oldest panda in Japan, as well as the fifth oldest known captive male panda in the world at the time of his death. Ling Ling's portrait and favorite food, bamboo shoots, were displayed in his cage following his death. Zoo visitors left bouquets of flowers and signed condolence registers.

== Legacy ==
Ling Ling's death left the Ueno Zoo without a resident giant panda for the first time in 36 years; since October 1972 when two pandas, Kang Kang and Lan Lan, were given to the zoo to mark the normalization of bilateral relations between Japan and China. Ueno Zoo reportedly feared a drop in its number of visitors due to the loss of Ling Ling. Approximately 3.5 million people visit Ueno Zoo each year, including about 40,000 people per day on holidays and weekends. However, many visitors came specifically to see Ling Ling and other panda-related attractions. Without Ling Ling, or another giant panda to replace him, the zoo feared that it would be unable to maintain current visitor numbers without pandas. During this time, Ueno Zoo was reportedly consulting the Japanese Foreign Ministry about obtaining a new panda from China.

Ling Ling was the only giant panda in Japan which was directly owned by the Japanese government or a Japanese institution. There are still eight other pandas located throughout Japan. However, each of these remaining eight pandas are currently on loan from China and are not Japanese-owned. Six of these pandas are currently housed at Adventure World in Shirahama, Wakayama Prefecture, while the two other pandas reside at Kobe Municipal Oji Zoo in Kobe.

Following Ling Ling's death, Japanese Prime Minister Yasuo Fukuda asked Chinese President Hu Jintao for two more pandas.

Ling Ling's death in April 2008 marked the second high-profile death of an "elderly" captive panda in less than one month. On April 2, 2008, Taotao, the oldest giant panda in captivity in China, died at Jinan Zoo at the age of 36.

== See also ==
- List of individual giant pandas
- List of individual bears
