= Ueno =

District in Taitō ward, Tokyo, Japan

Coordinates: 35.71547°N 139.77402°E

Ueno 上野
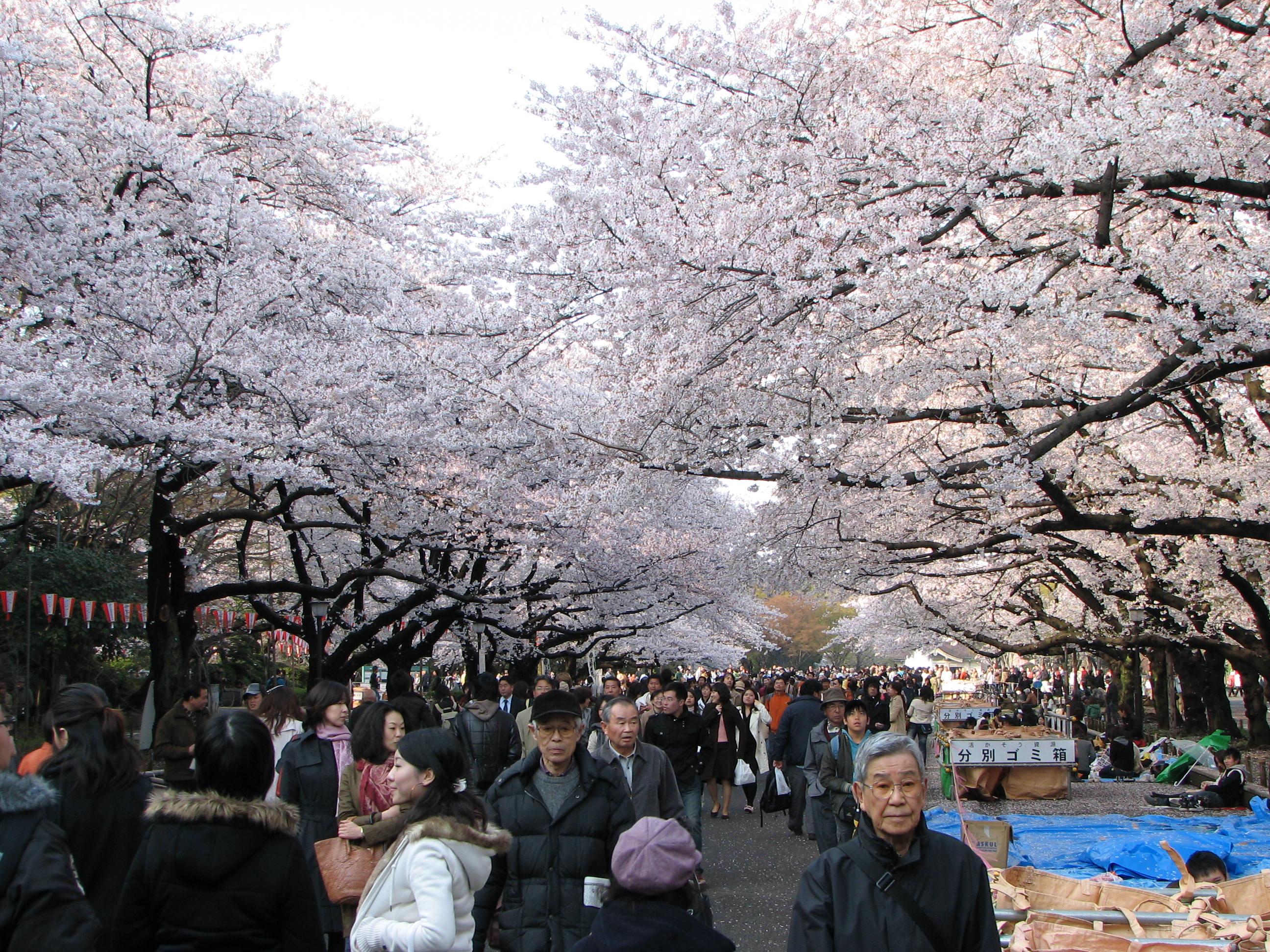
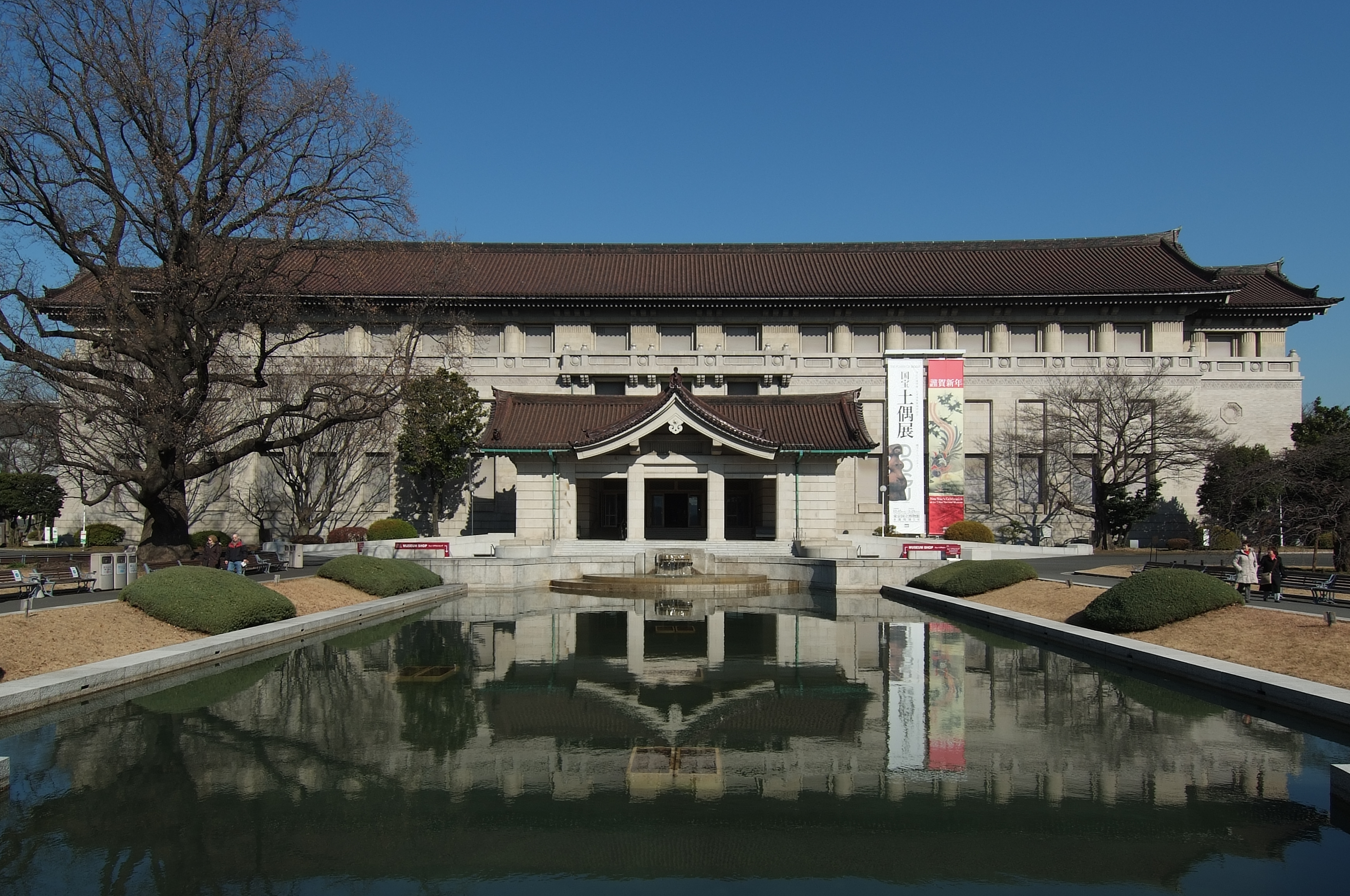
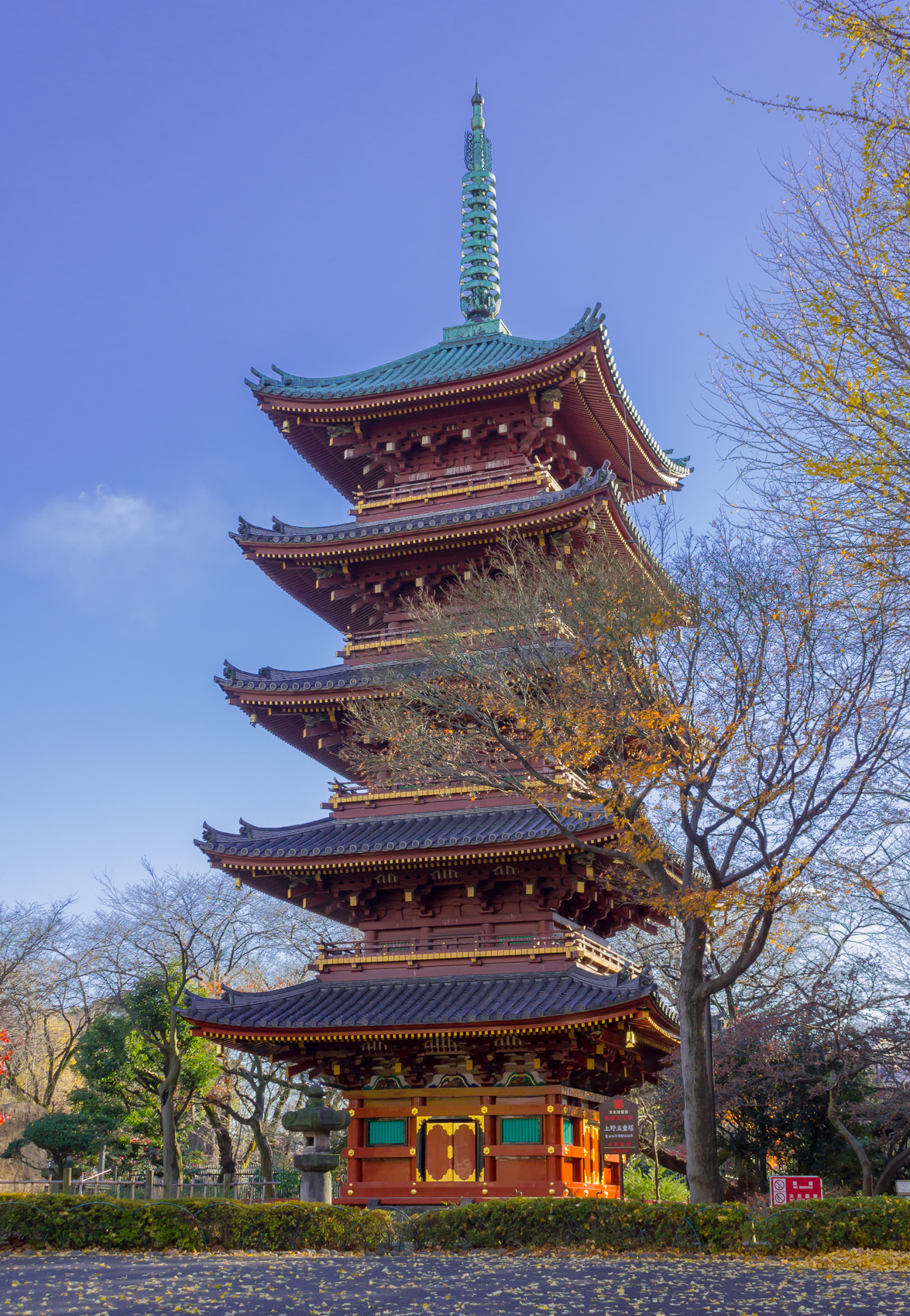
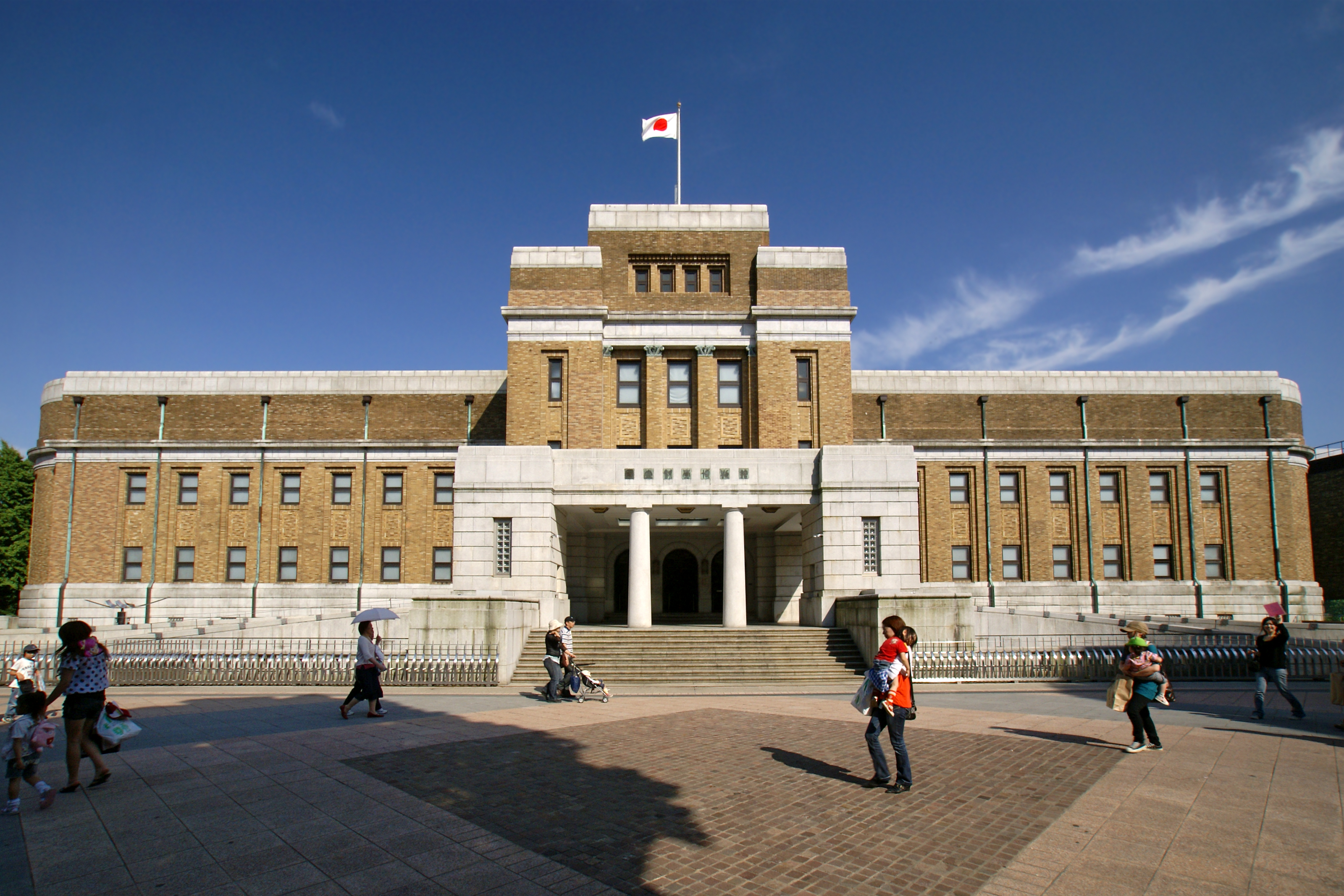
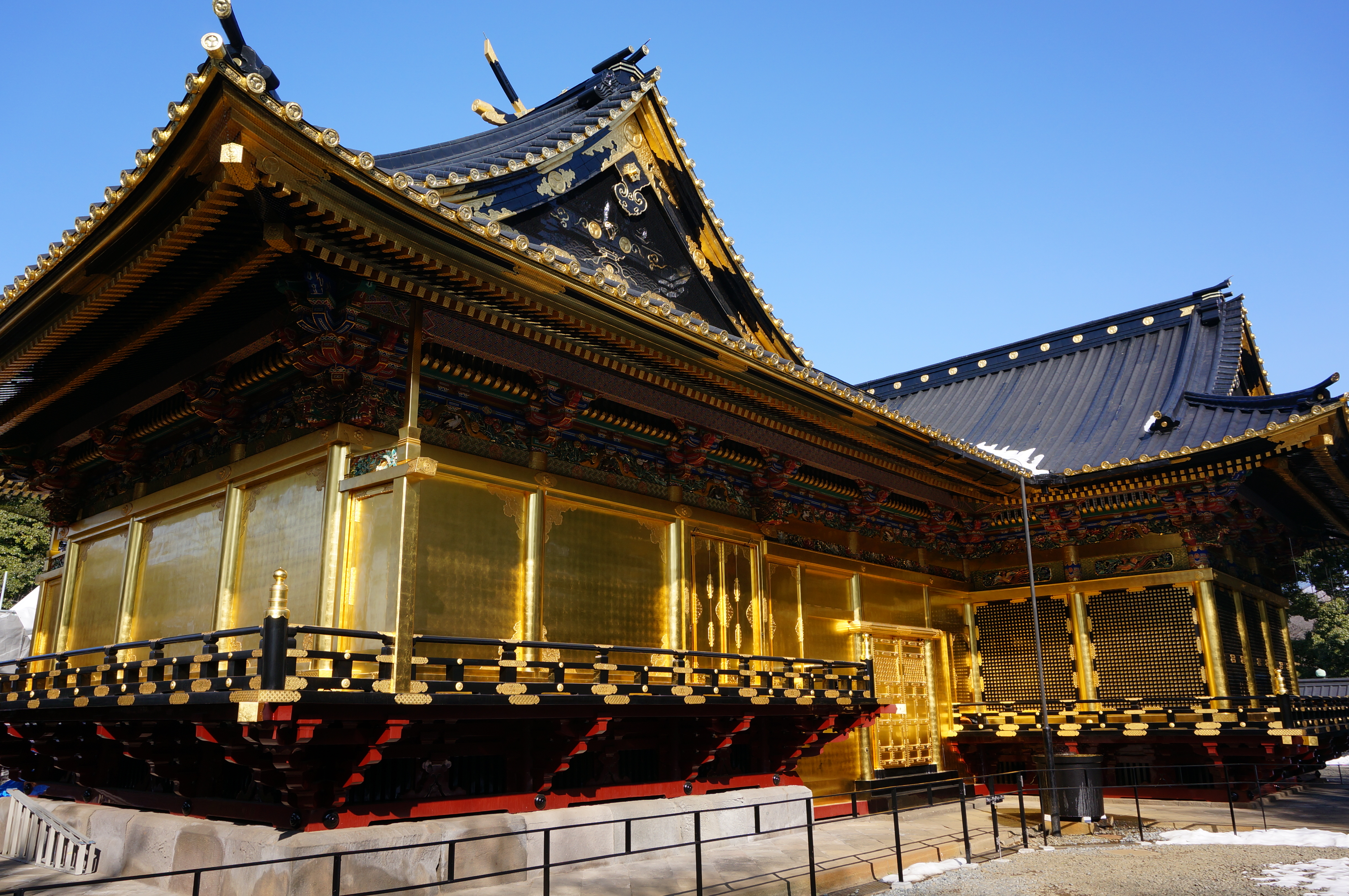
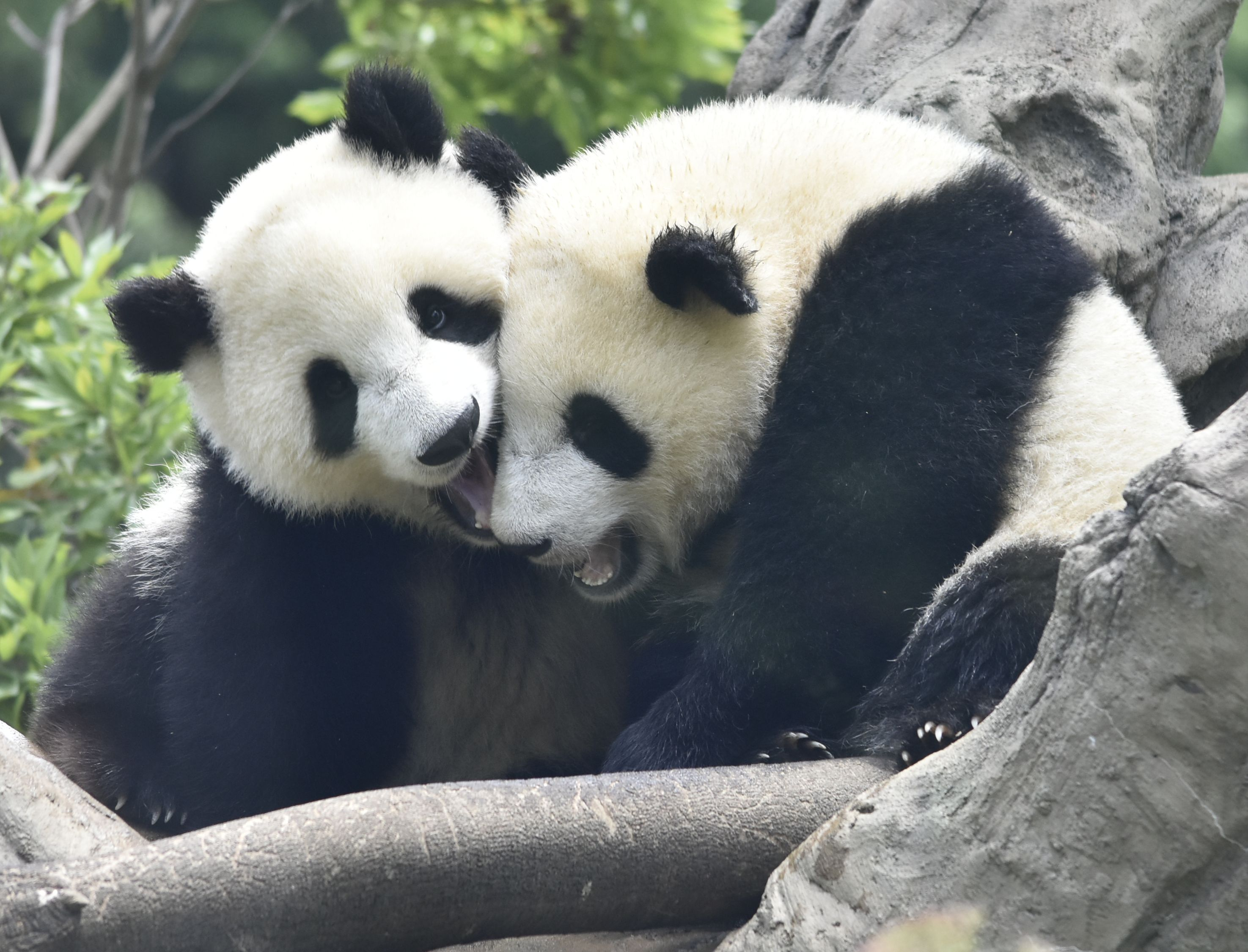
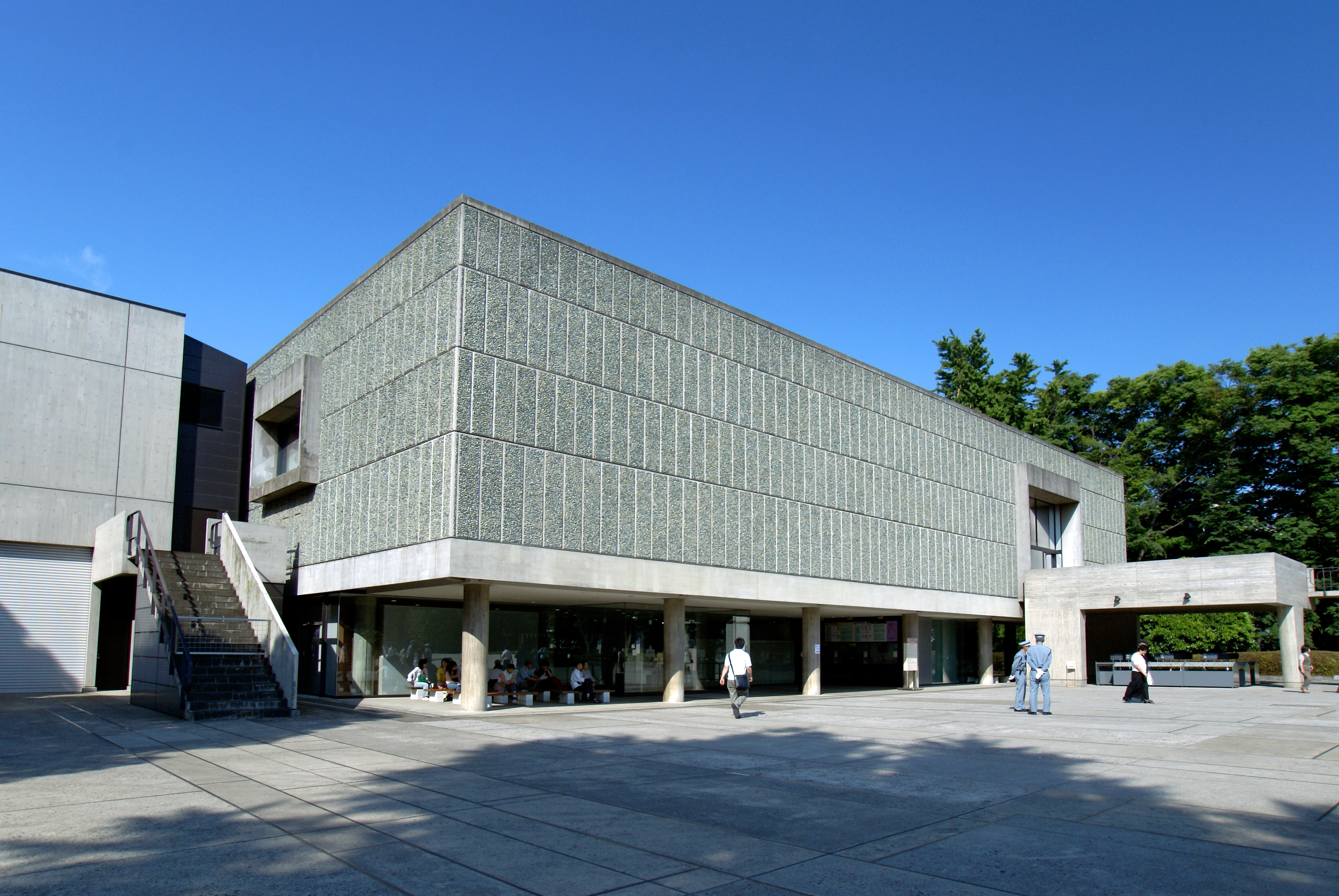
- Ueno Park Tokyo National Museum Five-storey pagoda of Kan'ei-ji National Museum of Nature and Science Ueno Tōshō-gū Ueno Zoo National Museum of Western Art
- Interactive map of Ueno

Population (2020)
  - Total: 3,710

Ueno (上野; Japanese pronunciation: [ɯ̈̀.é̞.nó̞] (Note: This is a placename. The family name is pronounced [ɯ̈́.è̞.nò̞].)) is a district in Taitō, Tokyo. The area extending from Ueno to Asakusa is part of the historical Shitamachi (literally "low city") district of Tokyo, which is often associated with working-class traditions and culture as well as their distinct accent. The district's name roughly translates into "Upper Field" in English.

The Ueno area, in the strict sense, centres around Ueno Station, which has historically been the terminus for long-distance trains bound for northern Japan, such as the Blue trains and the Shinkansen. To the north, Ueno Park stretches to the area just behind the University of Tokyo's Hongo Campus. Ueno Park houses some of Tokyo's finest cultural sites, including the Tokyo National Museum, the National Museum of Western Art, the National Museum of Nature and Science, and a major public concert hall. Numerous Buddhist temples can also be found in the park, including the Bentendo, dedicated to the goddess Benzaiten, on an island in Shinobazu Pond. The Kan'ei-ji, a major temple for the Tokugawa shōguns, also stands in this area, with its pagoda now located within the grounds of Ueno Zoo. Nearby is Ueno Tōshō-gū, a Shinto shrine dedicated to Tokugawa Ieyasu. The International Library of Children's Literature is also in the area.

To the south of the station lies Ameya-yokochō, a street market district that evolved from an open-air black market that sprang up during the privation following the Second World War, leading towards Okachimachi. Part of Ueno has also been known as a gay village since the Edo period, when the area had a large number of gay brothels.

== History ==
On 4 July 1868, during the Battle of Ueno of the Boshin War, pro-Imperial "Kangun" forces defeated remnants Shōgitai troops near the Kan'ei-ji temple. Most of the temple was destroyed and the Ueno Park was later built there.

== Economy ==
Ueno is the hometown of Yoshida Watch Shop, established in 1901 by Shogoro Yoshida. It is the origin of Orient Watch Co., Ltd.

== Education ==
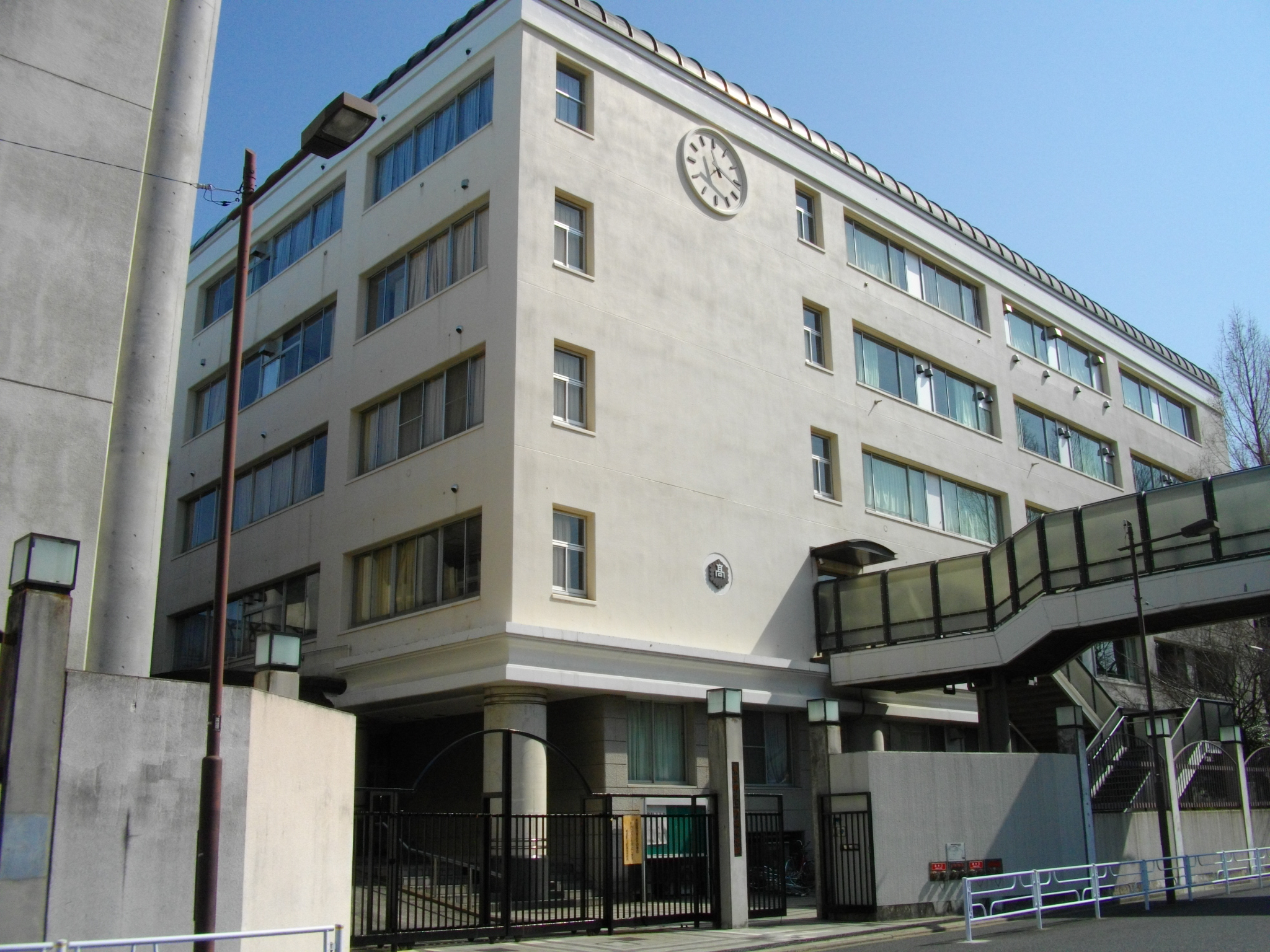
Ueno High School

- Tokyo University of the Arts

Public high schools are operated by the Tokyo Metropolitan Government Board of Education.

- Ueno High School

Taito City Board of Education operates public elementary and junior high schools.

Ueno 1-4 and 6-chome and part of Ueno 5-chome are zoned to Kuromon Elementary School (黒門小学校). Ueno 7-chome is zoned to Ueno Elementary School (上野小学校). A portion of Ueno 5-chome is zoned to Heisei Elementary School (平成小学校).

Ueno 1-2 chome is zoned to Ueno Junior High School (上野中学校). Ueno 4 and 7-chome and portions of 3 and 5-6-chome are zoned to Shinobugaoka Junior High School (忍岡中学校). Parts of Ueno 3 and 5-6 chome are zoned to Okachimachi Taito Junior High School (御徒町台東中学校).

Private schools:

- Iwakura High School
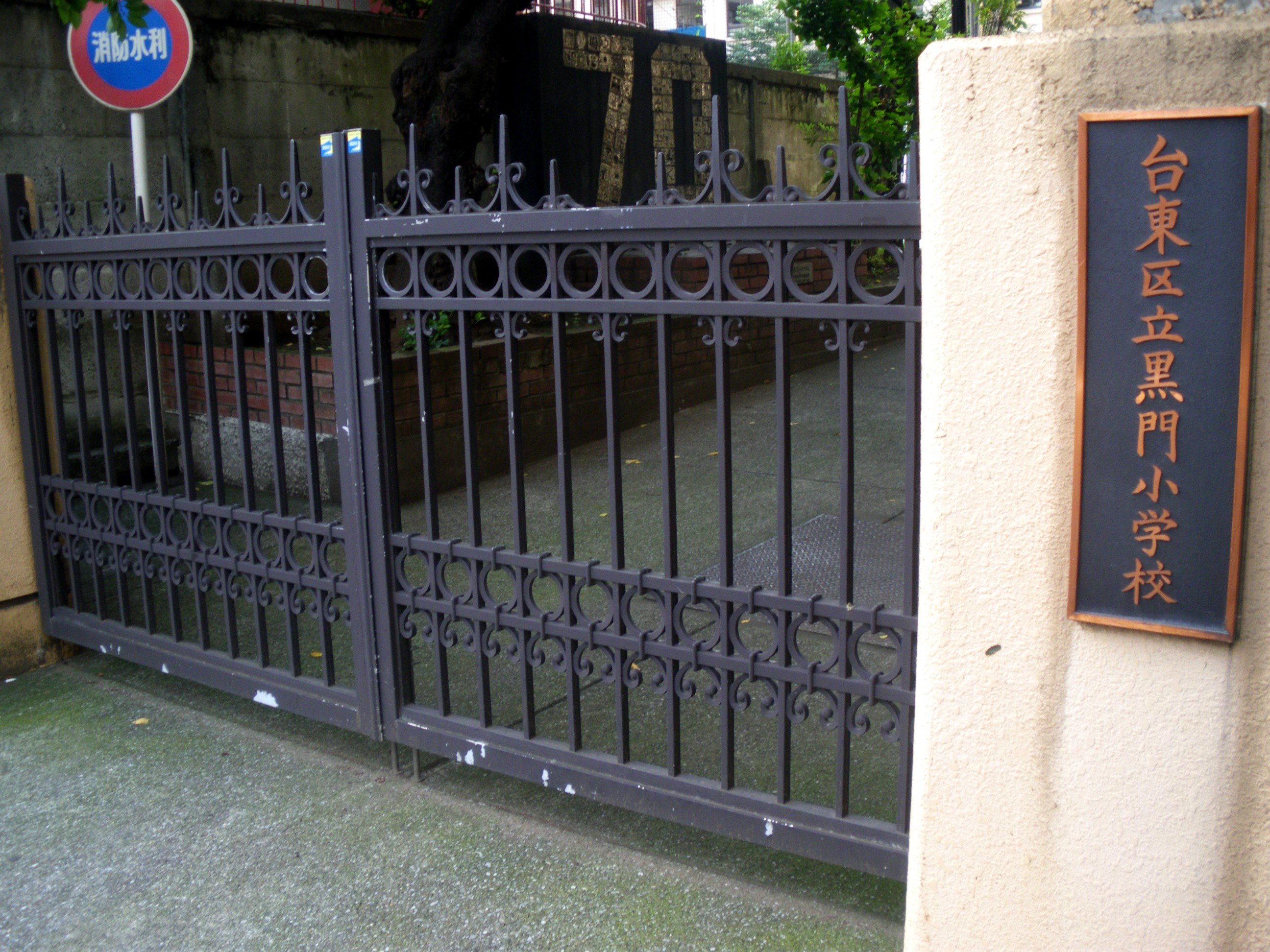
Kuromon Elementary School (黒門小学校) - 1-chome

== Public transport ==
- Ueno Station
- Okachimachi Station
- Ueno-hirokoji Station
- Ueno-okachimachi Station
- Naka-okachimachi Station
- Yushima Station
- Keisei Ueno Station

== See also ==
- Ueno Park
- Ueno Tōshō-gū
