= Ueno Zoo Monorail =

Former monorail at zoo in Taitō, Tokyo, Japan

Coordinates: 35°42′51.95″N 139°46′14.5″E

Ueno Zoo Monorail Line
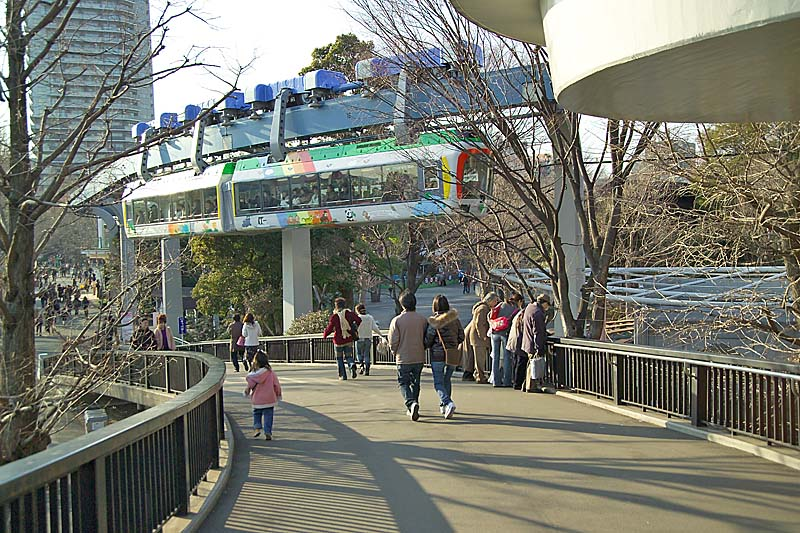

Overview
- Locale: Ueno Zoo
- Transit type: Suspended monorail
- Number of lines: 1
- Number of stations: 2

Operation
- Began operation: December 17, 1957
- Ended operation: October 31, 2019 (suspended); December 27, 2023 (decommissioned)
- Operator: Tokyo Metropolitan Bureau of Transportation
- Number of vehicles: 1

Technical
- System length: 0.3 km (0.19 mi)
- Electrification: 600 V DC

The Ueno Zoo Monorail Line (東京都交通局上野懸垂線, Tōkyō-to Kōtsū-kyoku Ueno Kensui-sen) was a 0.3 km (0.19 mi) long suspended railway operated by the Tokyo Metropolitan Bureau of Transportation (Toei). It lies within the Ueno Zoo in Taitō, Tokyo, Japan. The monorail is similar to the Wuppertal Schwebebahn, but has rubber tires rather than steel wheels. Many of the parts manufactured for the monorail were off-the-shelf. The first monorail in the nation (and the first zoo monorail in the world), it had two stations, single track, and operated at 600 V DC. The line began operating on December 17, 1957, was suspended during 2001–2002, and has been suspended since October 31, 2019, with the operator citing the high costs of replacing the aging trains. It was officially closed on December 27, 2023. Being located inside the zoo, it only operated on days when the zoo was open, and between 9:40 a.m. and 4:30 p.m., with departures scheduled every seven minutes. The fare for the 90-second trip was 150 yen.

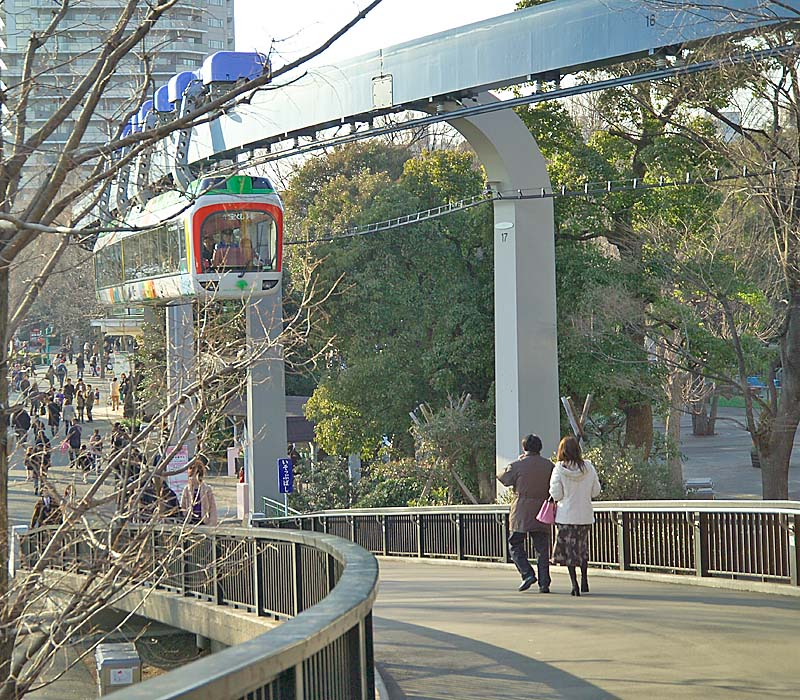
The Ueno Zoo Monorail carried passengers within the Ueno Zoo.

== History ==
The number of cars in Japan rose since the end of World War II, which caused heavy traffic congestions around Tokyo. Trams and bus routes operated by Tokyo Metropolitan Bureau of Transportation suffered from delays and loss of passengers caused by traffic congestions. The subway network in Tokyo was in construction from pre-war, and the Bureau of Transportation was also building their own subway line in 1958, but subways were expensive to build. Monorails were considered as the alternative to other transportation methods such as buses and subways, and Ueno Zoo was selected as the site for the monorail line. Monorails were in development at the time, and the Bureau of Transportation worked with Toshiba and Nippon Sharyo to develop a new method. The method was similar to the Wuppertal Schwebebahn, although it used rubber tires instead. This monorail was called "Ueno-style."

Permit to operate the line was given on June 22, 1957, by the Ministry of Transport, and the line opened on December 27 of that year. However, the Bureau of Transportation planned to close the line in 1980 due to financial difficulties and aging of equipments. This plan was stopped in 1983 after a safety check due to requests for the line to be kept in operation.

On January 23, 2019, the Bureau of Transportation announced that the line will be suspended due to aging of the rolling stocks introduced in 2001. The line was suspended on November of that year. The Bureau of Transportation was initially willing to maintain the line, but decided to permanently close the line in 2023.

== See also ==
- Monorails in Japan
