= Jinan Zoo =

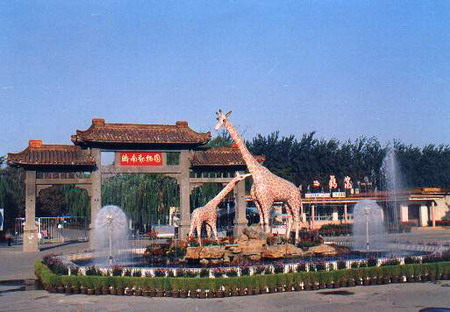
- Jinan Zoo and Jinan skyline
- Interactive map of Jinan Zoo
- 36°40′29.46″N 117°1′3.18″E
- Date opened: 1 May 1960
- Location: Jinan, China
- No. of animals: 3,0000
- No. of species: 260
- Annual visitors: 1,000,000+

Jinan Zoo (Chinese: 济南动物园; pinyin: Jǐnán dòngwùyuán), formerly known as Taurus Park, is a zoo located in the northern part of Jinan in Shandong province in Eastern China. Founded in October 1959, it opened 1 May 1960 and was renamed Jinan Zoo on 8 September 1989.

== History ==
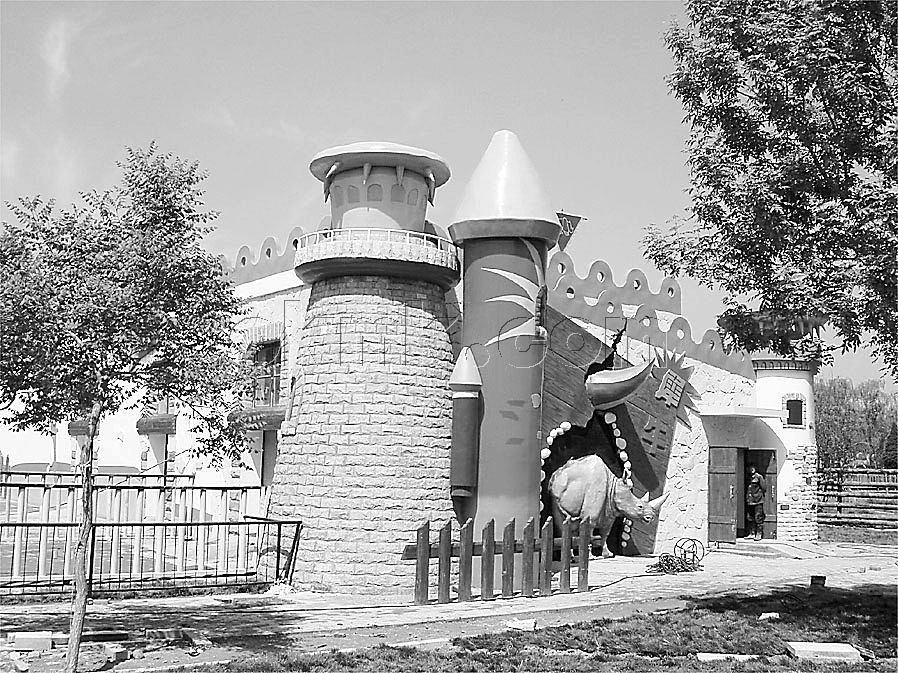
Jinan Zoo

Jinan Zoo opened to the public on 1 May 1960. It is one of the largest zoos in China. In 1995, it was named one of China's top ten zoos. It is now a large scale zoo which is involved in activities such as breeding, tours, zoology, entertainment and catering. It houses more than 300 different species of animals with over 5000 animals in total.

In the 1970s, Jinan Zoo planted large amounts of bamboo, which has since grown into five hectares of bamboo forest, to meet the living needs of their giant pandas and red pandas. Jinan Zoo strives to create a natural environment between the animals and their caregivers to best simulate the animals' natural habitats.

The zoo features four unique zones: animal display, entertainment, education and catering. In 1999, it constructed an area where peacocks can roam free. In 2000, US$800,000 was raised to construct China's most advanced herbivore natural habitat exhibit. Visitors are able to walk through this exhibit. In 2001, they once again raised over US$1,000,000,000 to construct a facility that allows young people to interact with animals. The flow to the zoo has reached over one million visitors a year.

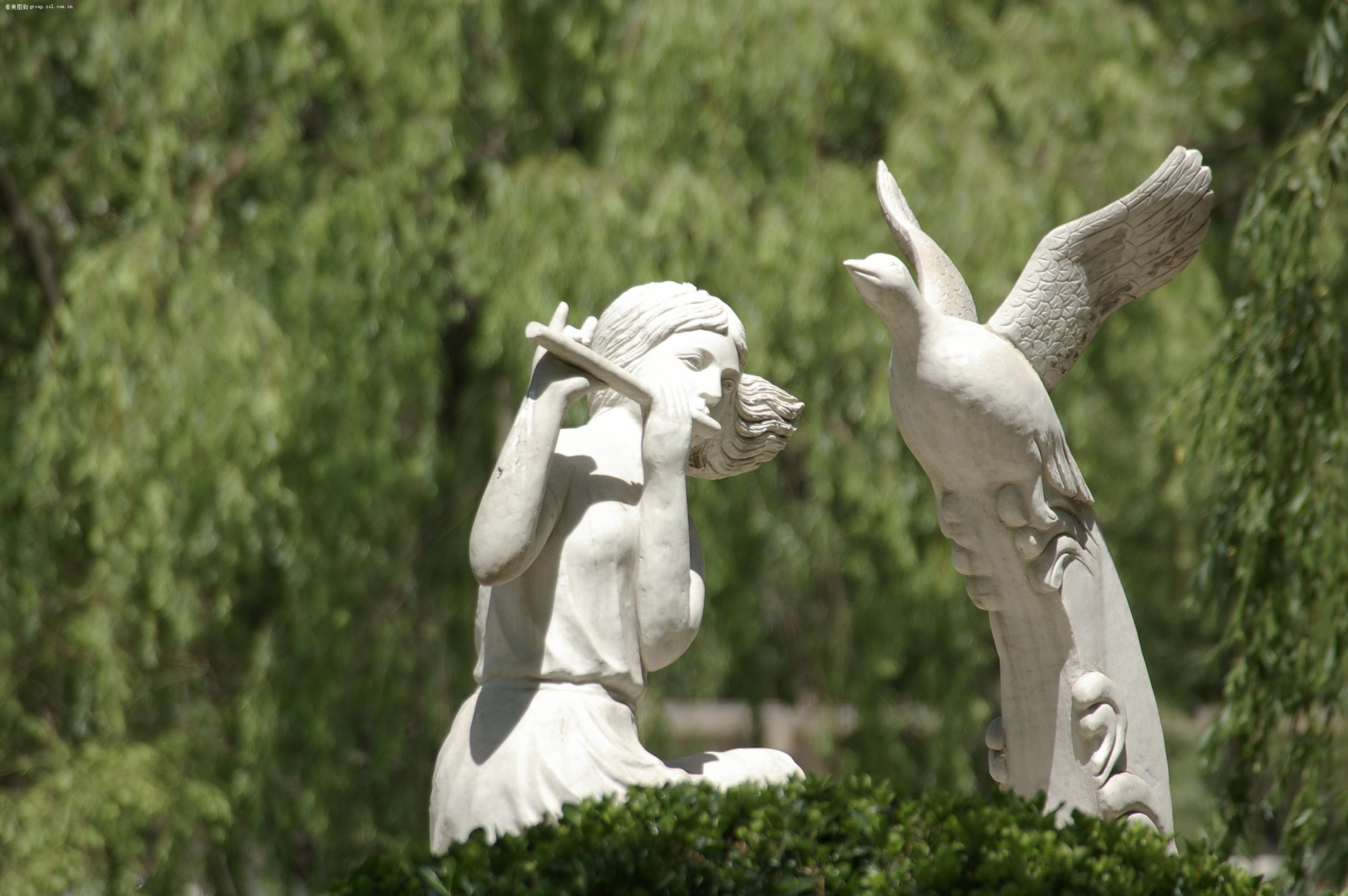
Sculpture in Jinan Zoo

== Animals ==
Species native to China housed at the zoo include giant pandas, golden snub-nosed monkeys, Asian elephants, takins, kiang, white-lipped deer, hoolock gibbons, Francois' langurs, red foxes and red-crowned cranes.

Jinan Zoo's most popular attractions include its giant pandas, grey wolves, golden snub-nosed monkeys, white tigers, Bengal tigers, leopards, giraffes, gorillas, zebras and egrets.

Other animals housed in the zoo's collection include African elephants, gorillas, chimpanzees, orangutans, white tigers, giraffes and zebras.

=== Notable animals ===
==== Willie the wolf ====
Willie was a male wolf, born in 1976 in Nürnberg, Germany. After the Barcelona International Wolf Breeding Center donated him to Jinan, the zoo paired him with a female wolf, named Lady, in 2009.

The wolf's mannerisms changed drastically upon being introduced to Lady. Before, it used to fight for its food. Upon the introduction of Lady, however, it would not touch its food until the female wolf finished eating. If it wasn't for the zoo's walls, locals have said "he might even catch sheep everyday to honour his wife". The wolf also displayed another interesting characteristic - Despite having spent many years in captivity, his wild nature remained unchanged. The wolf seemed to get immense satisfaction from digging holes. He liked to dig a yard full of holes and would hide food in them.

==== Taotao the giant panda ====
Taotao was a giant panda who arrived at Jinan Zoo in October 1994. Born in the wild in Gansu province, she was one of the zoo's star attractions and was seen by millions of visitors from 1994 to 2008. On April 2, 2008, Taotao died from brain thrombus and a cerebral hemorrhage at the age of 36. At the time of her death, she was China's oldest living giant panda. According to convention, Taotao's remains should have been returned to Gansu province after her death. Despite this tradition, her influence when she was alive was so strong, that her body was eventually stuffed and kept in Jinan.

==== Quan Quan the giant panda ====
Quan Quan is a giant panda loaned to Jinan Zoo from Wolong Nature Reserve on September 24, 2007. In December that year, she was given the name "Quan Quan", selected from over 1000 suggested names, meaning 'spring'.

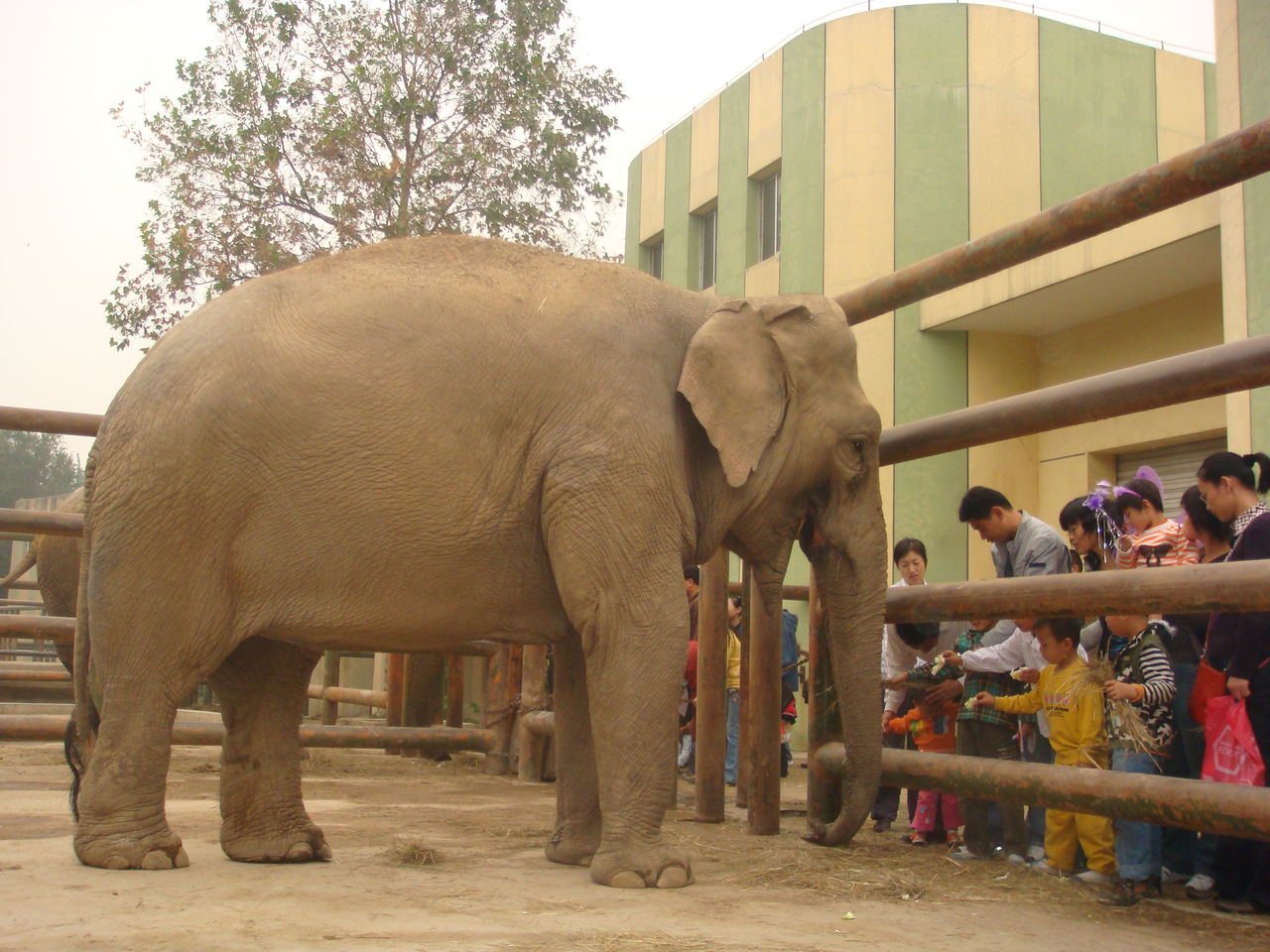
Elephant in Jinan Zoo

== Breeding ==
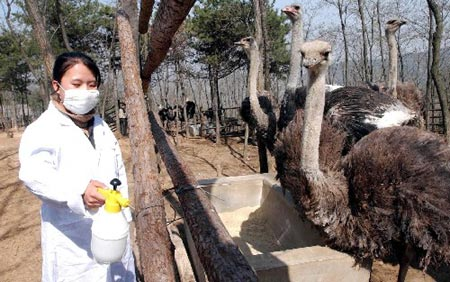
Breeding

Employees at the zoo have contributed to the knowledge of various fields, such as animal science, animal protection and animal breeding research.

In 1992, a pair of endangered golden snub-nosed monkeys bred at the zoo, making Jinan zoo one of the few zoos to successfully breed golden snub-nosed monkeys. In 1998, an area of 3000m^{2} was created for the hundred-bird paradise that houses over 150 different bird species to promote breeding.

Other animals that have successfully bred at Jinan Zoo include Asian elephants, golden monkeys, gibbons, langurs, takin, black storks, white storks, western grey kangaroos, white-lipped deer, giraffes and seals.

== Future ==
The zoo plans to reduce the number of fences and walls to create a better environment for both their visitors and the animals. However, this idea still requires further discussion and regarding safety. In the near future, the zoo hopes to increase the amount of human-animal interactions.

== Public transportation ==
Jinan Zoo is also a public transit hub. Line 4 of the Jinan BRT transportation system stops at the Jinan Zoo Station. The zoo is the bus terminus for routes4, 5, 15,12,30and 35. Bus routes 4, 35, 30, 15, 5, 66, K68, 84, 85, K90, K92 K53, K50, K58, 111, 114, 112, 130, 203 and 35 also stop at the zoo.

== Nearby attractions ==
To the west of the zoo is the Jinan Planetarium, located diagonally across the street from the zoo's main entrance. To the east is a shopping mall and the Jinan Restaurant.
