= Ueno (surname) =

Ueno (上野／植野; Japanese pronunciation: [ɯ̈́.è̞.nò̞] (Note: This is a family name. The placename is pronounced [ɯ̈̀.é̞.nó̞].)) is a Japanese surname. Historically, it was also romanized as Uyeno, and some Japanese-descended people outside of Japan still retain this spelling. Notable people with the surname include:

- Chizuko Ueno (上野 千鶴子; born 1948), Japanese sociologist
- Emiko Ueno (植野 恵美子; born 1957), Japanese female badminton player
- Hideaki Ueno (上野 秀章; born 1981), Japanese football player
- Hidesaburō Ueno (上野 英三郎; 1871–1925), Japanese agricultural scientist
- Hikoma Ueno (上野 彦馬; 1838–1904), pioneer Japanese photographer
- Hirokazu Ueno (上野 裕和; born 1977), Japanese professional shogi player
- Hiroki Ueno (baseball) (上野 大樹; born 1986), Japanese professional baseball pitcher
- Hiroki Ueno (ice hockey) (上野 拓紀; born 1986), Japanese professional ice hockey winger
- Juri Ueno (上野 樹里; born 1986), Japanese actress
- Kagenori Ueno (上野 景範; 1845–1888), Japanese Consul in Great Britain from 1874 to 1879
- Ken Ueno (born 1970), American composer
- Kenji Ueno (上野 健爾, born 1945), Japanese mathematician
- Kenichiro Ueno (上野 賢一郎; born 1965), Japanese politician
- Kōji Ueno (上野 耕路; born 1960), Japanese composer and musician
- Kyuhei Ueno (上野 九平), Japanese mixed martial artist
- Masae Ueno (上野 雅恵; born 1979), Japanese female judoka
- Nobuhiro Ueno (上野 展裕; born 1965), Japanese football coach and former player
- Osamu Ueno (上野 修; born 1983), Japanese freestyle skier
- Rie Ueno (上野 理恵; born 1976), Japanese long-distance runner
- Shōichi Ueno (上野 尚一; 1936–2016), Japanese newspaper publisher and philanthropist
- Tadami Ueno (上野 忠美; born 1948), Japanese professional golfer
- Takahiro Ueno (上野 高広; born 1971), Japanese professional drifting driver and businessman
- Taro Ueno (上野 太郎; born 1980), Japanese sailor
- Toshiya Ueno (上野 俊哉; 1963–2013), Japanese film director, actor, screenwriter, and producer
- Yoichi Ueno (上野 陽一; 1883–1957), Japanese business theorist
- Yoko Ueno (上野 洋子; born 1963), Japanese recording artist
- Yoshie Ueno (上野 順恵; born 1983), Japanese female judoka
- Yoshiharu Ueno (上野 良治; born 1973), Japanese footballer
- Yuichiro Ueno (上野 裕一郎; born 1985), Japanese long-distance runner
- Yuki Ueno (上野 勇希; born 1995), Japanese professional wrestler
- Yukiko Ueno (上野 由岐子; born 1982), Japanese softball pitcher
- Yusaku Ueno (上野 優作; born 1973), Japanese football player

== Fictional characters ==
- Naoka Ueno, a character from A Silent Voice (manga)
- Susumu Ueno, a teen idol character from A One-Way Ticket to Love (movie)
