= Kang Kang and Lan Lan =

Giant pandas formerly on exhibit at Ueno Zoo

- Species: Giant panda
- Sex: Male (Kang Kang); Female (Lan Lan)
- Born: 1970 (Kang Kang); 1969 (Lan Lan); Sichuan, China
- Died: June 30, 1980 (aged 9–10) (Kang Kang); September 4, 1979 (aged 9–10) (Lan Lan); Ueno Zoo, Japan

Kang Kang (Chinese: 康康; pinyin: Kāng kāng; 1970 - June 30, 1980) and Lan Lan (兰兰; Lán lán; 1969 - September 4, 1979) were two giant pandas born in China. They were the first pair of giant pandas to live at Ueno Zoo in Tokyo, gifted to Japan by China after the normalization of relations between the two countries.

Kang Kang and Lan Lan caused an immediate sensation when they arrived in Japan. Subsequently, a so-called "panda boom" occurred in the country. In 1974, the two pandas attracted 7.64 million visitors.

Kang Kang and Lan Lan failed to produce any cubs. In January 1980, another female giant panda, Huan Huan, came to Japan from China to be Kang Kang's second "bride". However, Kang Kang died suddenly of a summer cold on June 30 after six months. In September 1979, ten-year-old Lan Lan died of acute renal insufficiency complicated by uremia, and the fetus was found in its belly during the autopsy.

== See also ==
- Panda diplomacy
- List of individual giant pandas
- List of individual bears
