= Ri Ri and Shin Shin =

Giant pandas

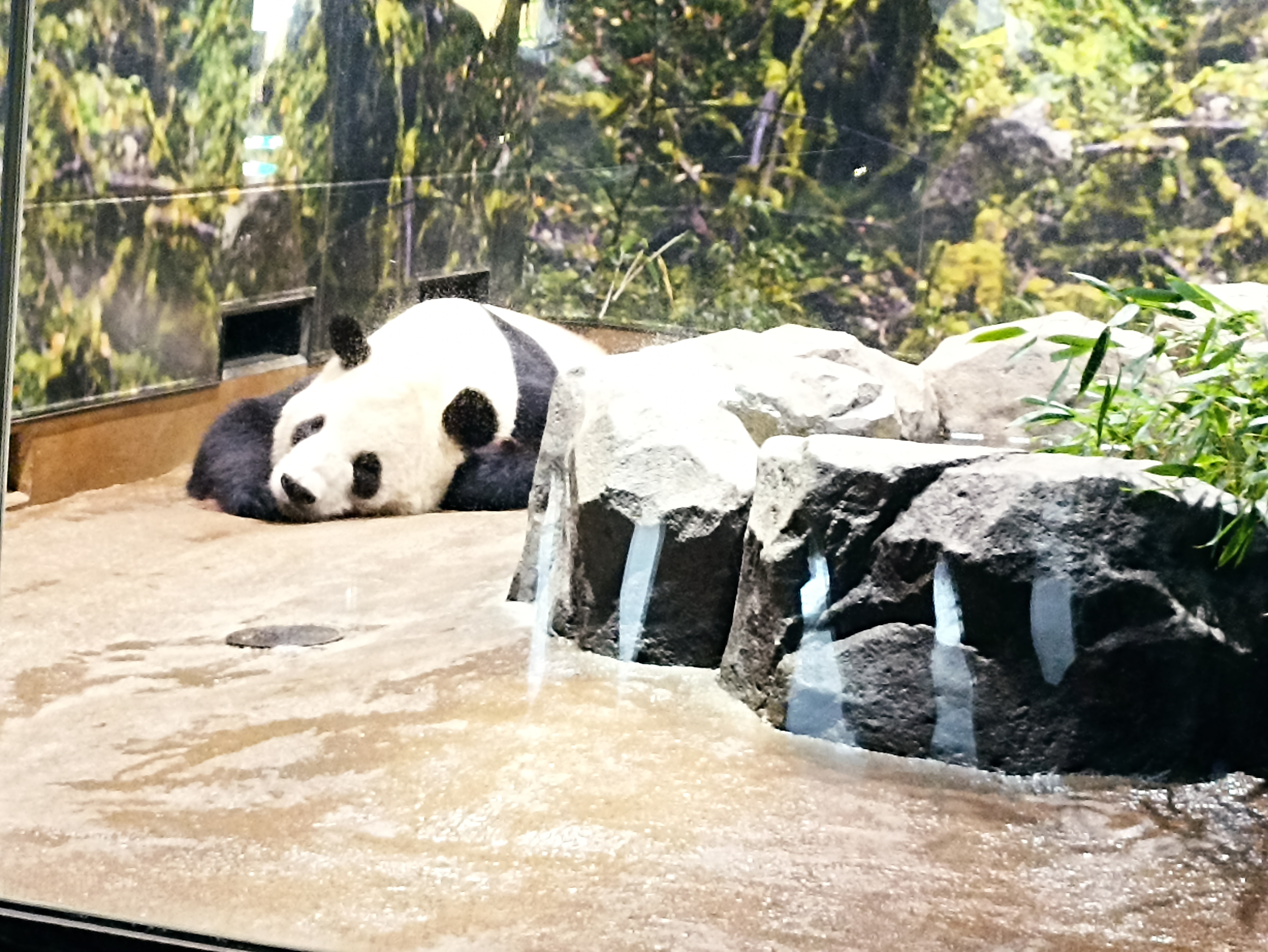
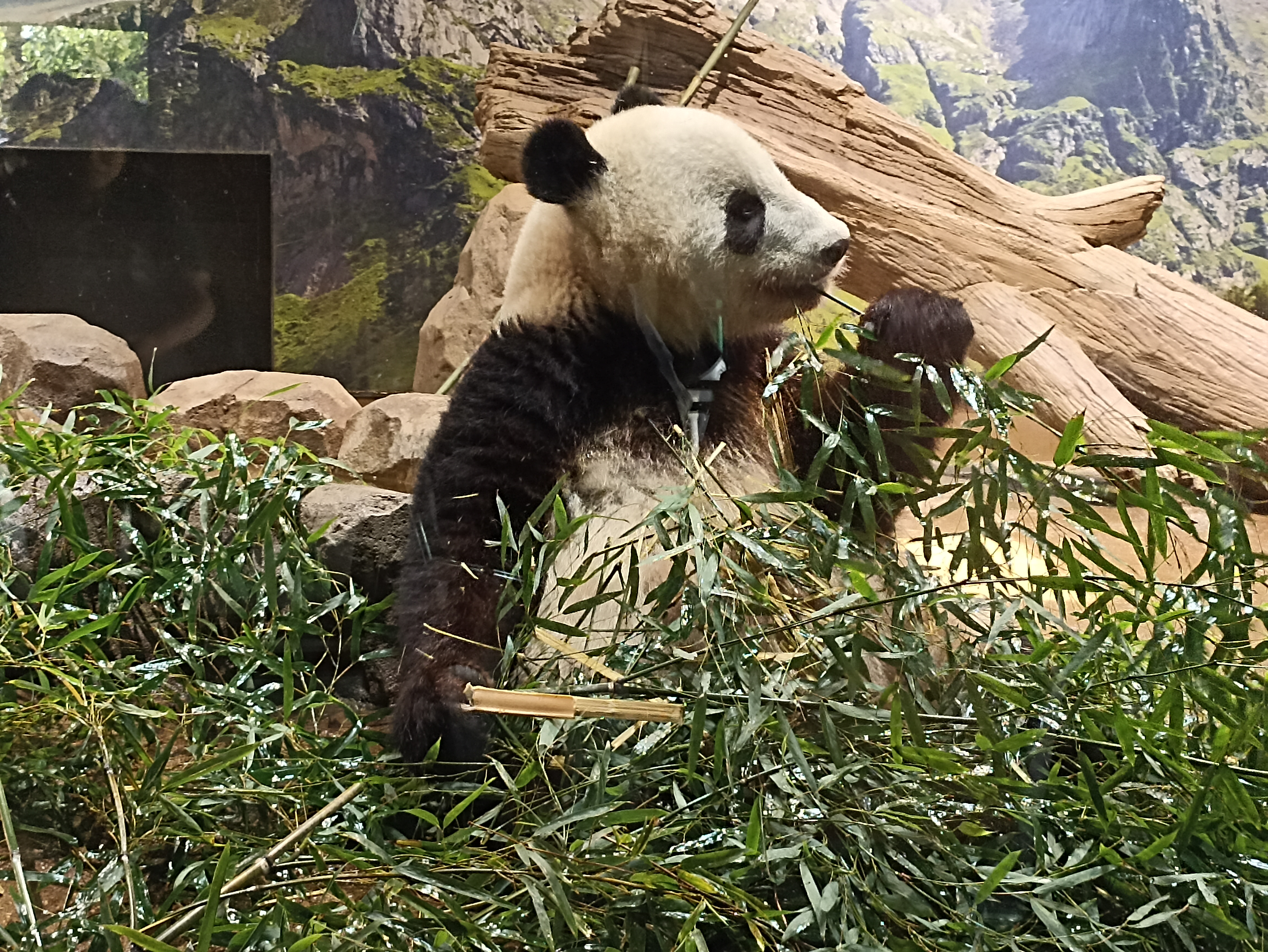
- Ri Ri sleeping at the Ueno Zoo in 2024 Shin Shin eating bamboo at the Ueno Zoo in 2024
- Species: Giant panda
- Sex: Male (Ri Ri); Female (Shin Shin)
- Born: August 16, 2005 (age 21) (Ri Ri); 2005 (age 20–21) (Shin Shin); China

Ri Ri (Japanese: 力力, romanized: Ri Ri; Chinese: 比力; pinyin: Bǐlì; born August 16, 2005) and Shin Shin (Japanese: 真真, romanized: Shin Shin; Chinese: 仙女; pinyin: Xiānnǚ; born July 3, 2005) are two giant pandas. After the 2011 Tōhoku earthquake and tsunami, the two pandas traveled from China to Tokyo, where they arrived at Ueno Zoo on February 21, 2011, to lift the mood of the Japanese public.

== Life ==
Ri Ri was born on August 16, 2005, and Shin Shin was born on July 3, 2005, in Wolong, China, through natural mating. They were later brought to the Ueno Zoo in Tokyo, Japan.

In early 2012, Ri Ri was found mating with Shin Shin, who gave birth to a male cub on July 5 that year. The cub died from pneumonia six days later. Ri Ri and Shin Shin later had three more cubs together: Xiang Xiang (born June 12, 2017), and twins Xiao Xiao (male) and Lei Lei (female) (born June 23, 2021).

On September 29, 2024, Ri Ri and Shin Shin returned to China. They were scheduled to be returned in early 2026, along with Xiao Xiao and Lei Lei, but were returned sooner to receive treatment for health issues.

== See also ==
- List of individual giant pandas
- List of individual bears
