= Ueno Zoo =

Zoo in Taitō, Tokyo, Japan

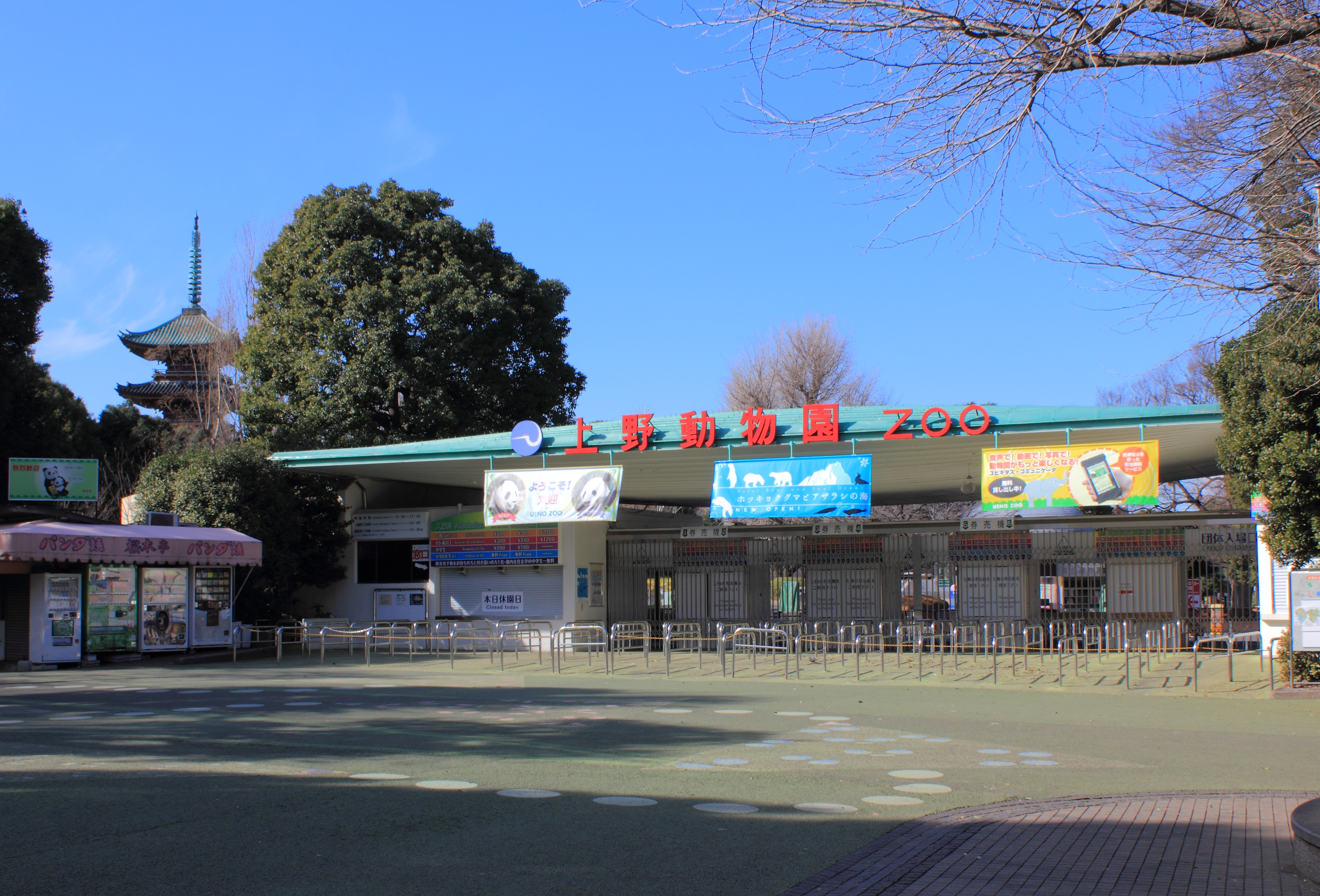
- Ueno Zoo entrance gate
- Interactive map of Ueno Zoo
- 35°43′03″N 139°46′17″E
- Date opened: March 20, 1882; 144 years ago
- Location: Tokyo, Japan
- Land area: 14.3 ha (35 acres)
- No. of animals: 2600
- No. of species: 464
- Memberships: JAZA
- Major exhibits: giant panda, Sumatran tiger, western lowland gorilla
- Public transit: Ueno; Ueno; Nezu; Keisei Ueno
- Website: https://www.tokyo-zoo.net/zoo/ueno/, https://www.tokyo-zoo.net/english/ueno/, https://www.tokyo-zoo.net/chinese/ueno/, https://www.tokyo-zoo.net/korean/ueno/

The Ueno Zoo (恩賜上野動物園, Onshi Ueno Dōbutsuen) is a 14.3-hectare (35-acre) zoo, managed by the Tokyo Metropolitan Government, and located in Taitō, Tokyo, Japan. It is Japan's oldest zoo, opened on March 20, 1882. It is served by Ueno Station, Keisei Ueno Station and Nezu Station, with convenient access from several public transportation networks (JR East, Tokyo Metro and Keisei Electric Railway). The Ueno Zoo Monorail, the first monorail in the country, connected the eastern and western parts of the grounds, however the line was suspended from 2019 onwards due to ageing infrastructure until being announced as closing permanently on 27 December 2023.

The zoo is in Ueno Park, a large urban park that is home to museums, a small amusement park, and other attractions. The zoo is closed on Mondays (Tuesday if Monday is a holiday).

== History ==
The zoo started life as a menagerie attached to the National Museum of Natural History. In 1881, responsibility for this menagerie was handed to naturalist and civil servant Tanaka Yoshio, who oversaw its transition into a public zoo, the Ueno Imperial Zoo. The ground was originally estate of the imperial family, but was bestowed (恩賜, onshi; forming the first part of the name in Japanese, untranslated officially) to the municipal government in 1924—along with Ueno Park—on the occasion of crown prince Hirohito's wedding.

=== World War II ===
In August 1943, the administrator of Tokyo, Shigeo Ōdachi, ordered that all "wild and dangerous animals" at the zoo be killed, claiming that bombs could hit the zoo and escaped animals would wreak havoc in the streets of Tokyo (in truth, Ōdachi gave the order for propaganda purposes). Requests by the staff at the zoo for a reprieve, or to evacuate the animals elsewhere, were refused. Ōdachi's order was then carried out with unusual and unnecessary cruelty by acting zoo director Saburō Fukuda. The animals were executed primarily by poisoning, strangulation or by simply placing the animals on starvation diets. A memorial service was held for the animals in September 1943 (while two of the elephants were still starving) and a permanent memorial (built anew in 1975) can be found in the Ueno Zoo.

Shortly after the March 1945 bombings of Tokyo, the Japanese placed U.S. Army Air Force navigator and bombardier Ray "Hap" Halloran on display naked in a Ueno Zoo tiger cage, as Halloran later recalled "'the hated B-29 prisoner', naked, unwashed and covered with sores from fleas, lice and bed bug bites", so civilians could walk in front of the cage and view him.

In 1949, elephants Hanako and Indira were imported to live at the zoo. After a few years, Hanako was moved to Inokashira Park's zoo in Mitaka and Indira was sent on a tour of Japan.

=== Recent renovations ===
The zoo provides animals an environment similar to their natural habitat. In recent years, some of the old-fashioned cages of the past have been replaced with more modern habitats, such as the "Gorilla Woods", built after two well-publicised mishaps in 1999. Many of the animal enclosures, such as those of the giraffes, hippopotamuses, and rhinoceroses are still the old style single stall concrete cages with very little room for the animals to move around.

== Animals ==
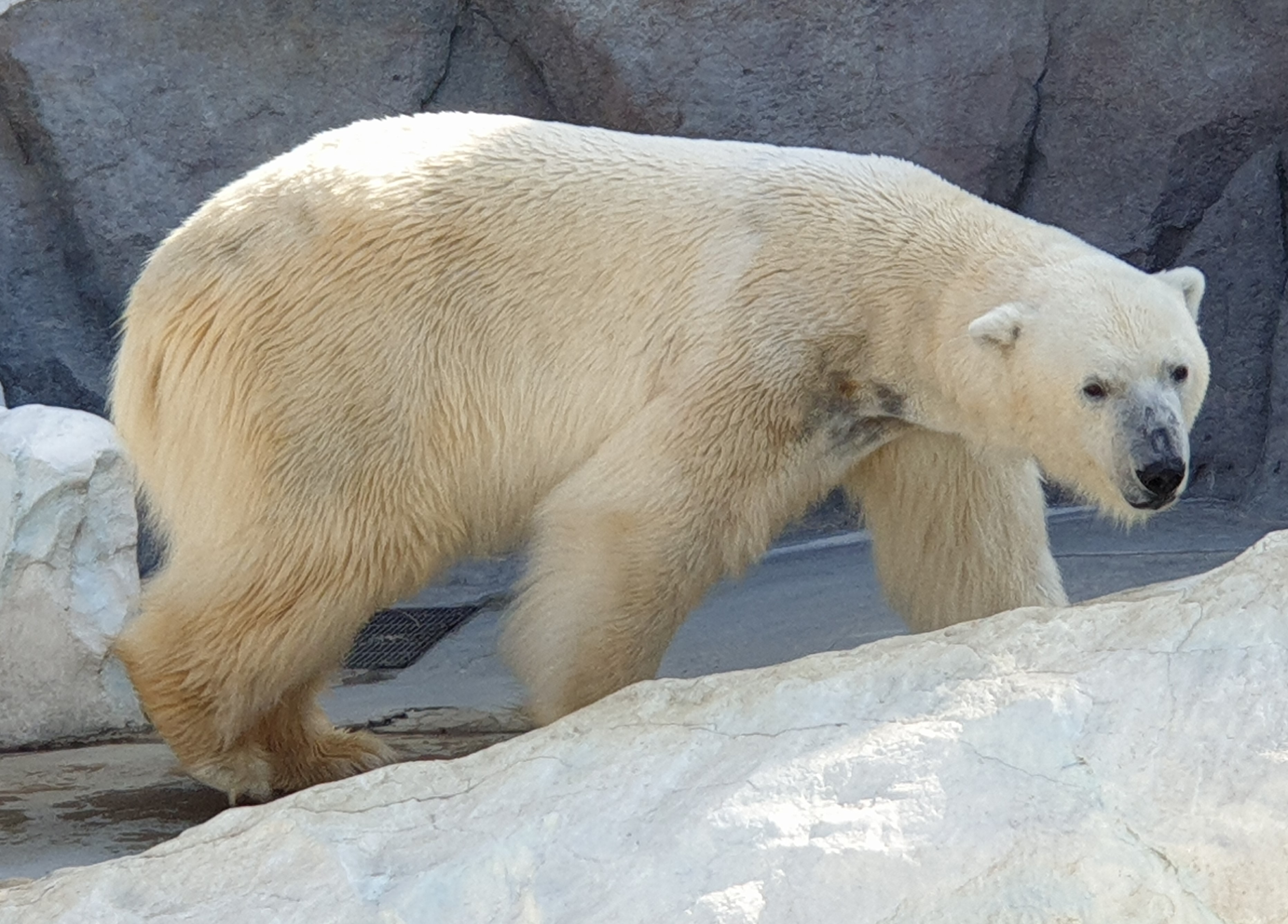
Polar bear at the Ueno Zoo

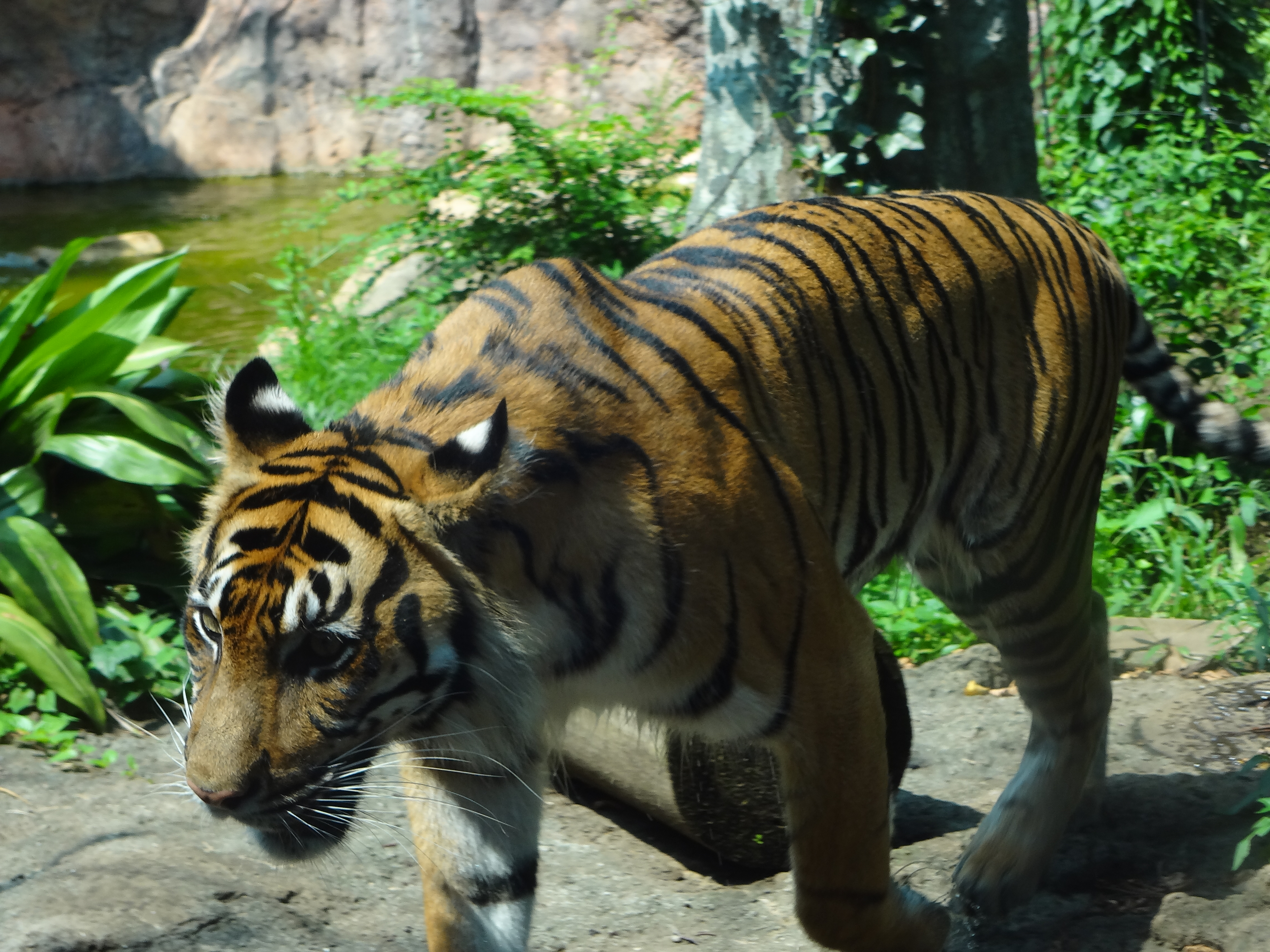
Tiger at the Ueno Zoo

The zoo is home to more than 2,600 individuals representing over 500 species.

=== Principal animals ===
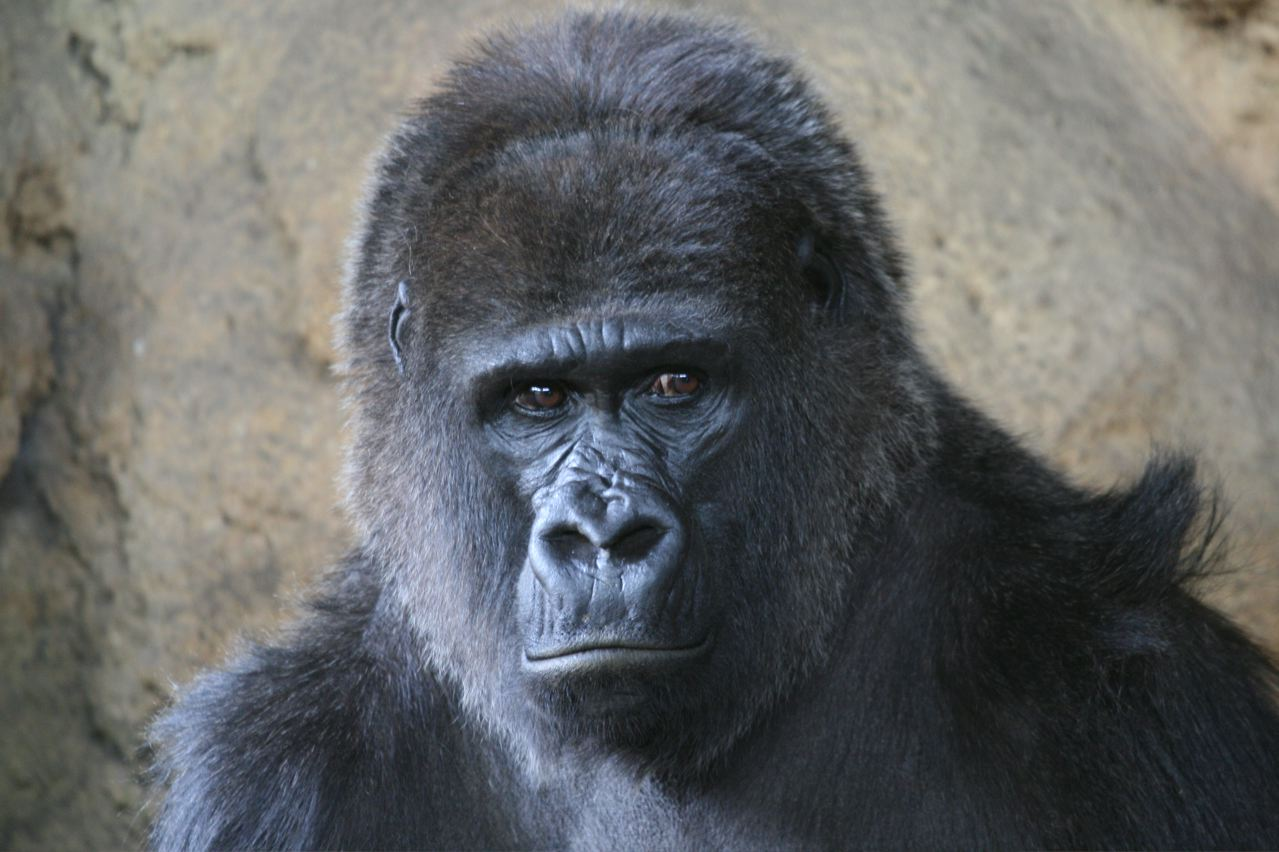
Western lowland gorilla at the Ueno Zoo

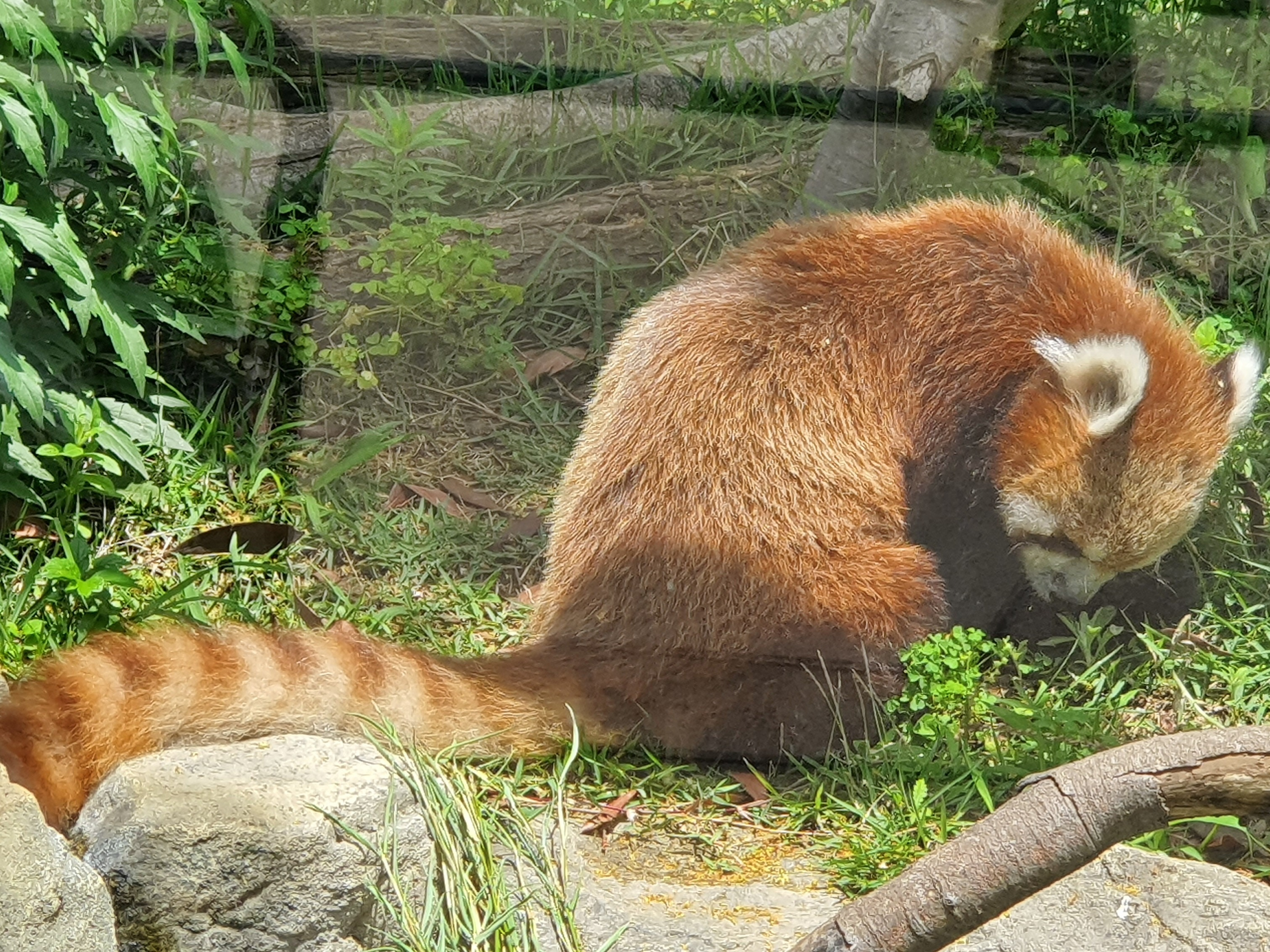
Red panda at the Ueno Zoo

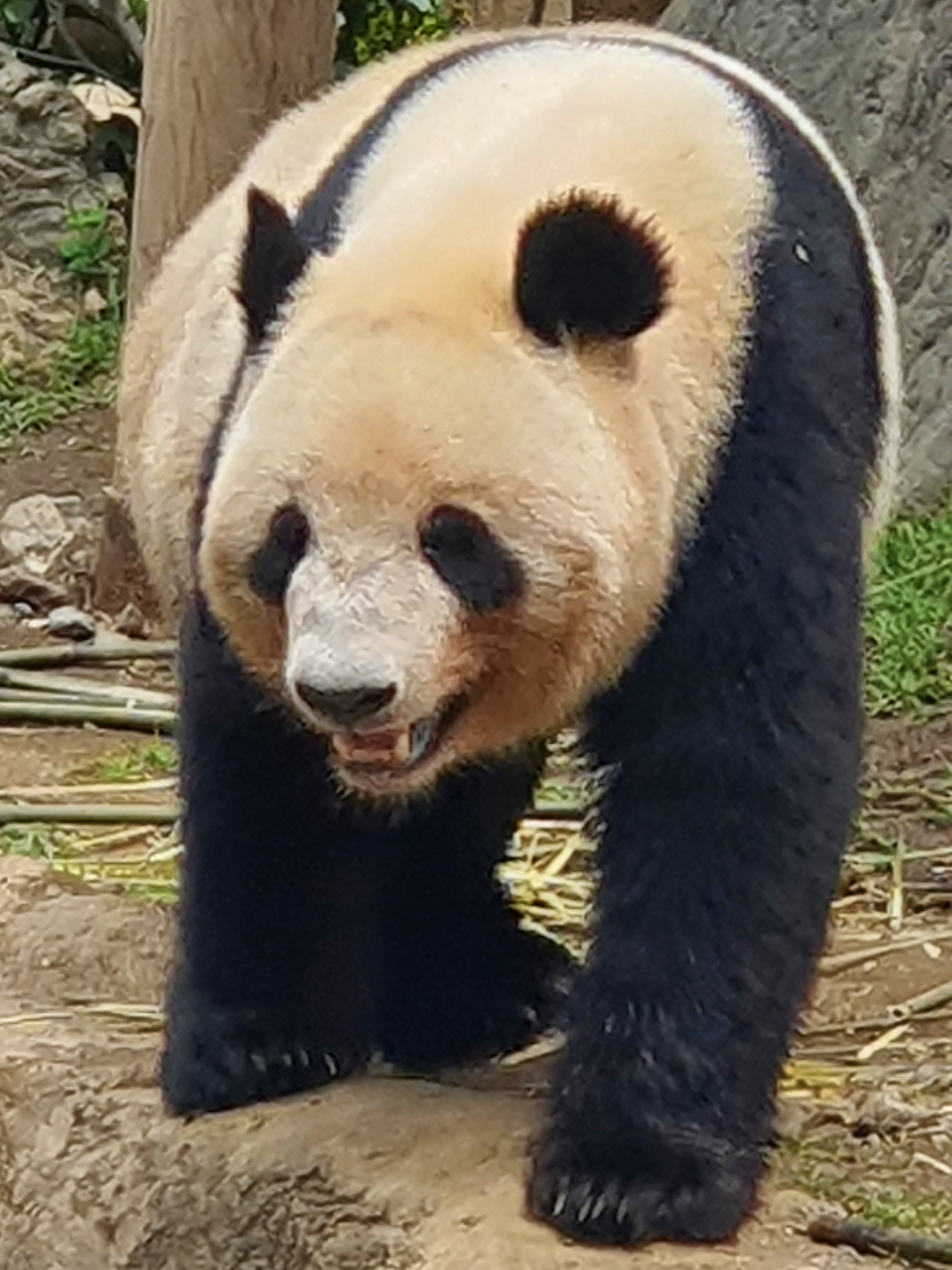
Giant panda at Ueno Zoo in 2024

After the death of giant panda Ling Ling in 2008, Ueno Zoo was without a member of this species for the first time since 1972. Two new giant pandas arrived from the Chinese Wolong Nature Reserve in February 2011. The male panda, Billy (比力 ビーリー) was renamed in Ueno to Ri Ri (力力 リーリー) to emphasize his playful vitality. The female's name Siennyu (仙女 シィエンニュ 'Fairy') was changed to Shin Shin (真真 シンシン), referring to purity (純真) and innocence (天真). The new names were based on a public poll. The final choices picked by the zoo were, however, not among top choices. Reduplication is very common in panda names.

On July 5, 2012, Shin Shin gave birth to an unnamed male cub that died six days later from pneumonia. She later gave birth to a female cub, Xiang Xiang, on June 12, 2017. On June 23, 2021, Shin Shin gave birth to male and female twin cubs, later named Xiao Xiao (暁暁 シャオシャオ) and Lei Lei (蕾蕾 レイレイ). In January 2026, the pandas were returned to China, leaving Japan without giant pandas for the first time since 1972, attributed to the rising tensions between China and Japan in 2025.

The zoo is split into two sections, connected by a bridge called the Aesop Bridge, built in 1961 and a monorail (now defunct).

=== List of animals ===
As of 2026:

==== East Garden ====
Japanese animals

- Bewick's swan
- Chinese bamboo partridge
- Eurasian collared dove
- Japanese scops owl
- Japanese serow
- Japanese squirrel
- Japanese wood pigeon
- Lidth's jay
- Rock ptarmigan

Prairie animals

- American bison
- Black-tailed prairie dog

Monkeys of the World

- Black-handed spider monkey
- De Brazza's monkey
- Japanese macaque
- Mantled guereza

Pheasants, otters, and birds of prey

- African white-backed vulture
- Andean condor
- Eurasian otter
- Green pheasant
- Japanese wood pigeon
- Mountain hawk-eagle
- Palawan peacock-pheasant
- Snowy owl
- Steller's sea eagle
- Ural owl

Elephant Forest

- Asian elephant

Bear Hill

- Japanese black bear
- Oriental small-clawed otter

Polar Bear and Seal Oceans

- Harbor seal
- Polar bear

Cranes, Secretarybird, and Crested ibis

- African sacred ibis
- Black-necked crane
- Northern bald ibis
- Red-crowned crane
- Secretarybird
- Wattled crane

Nocturnal house & tapir

- Greater slow loris
- Leschenault's rousette
- South American tapir

Gorilla Woods and Tiger Forest

- Edwards's pheasant
- Sumatran tiger
- Western lowland gorilla
- White-handed gibbon

==== West Garden ====
Animals of Africa

- Eastern black rhinoceros
- Giraffe
- Hippopotamus
- Pygmy hippopotamus

Vivarium

- Asian arowana
- Burmese python
- Daruma pond frog
- Emerald tree boa
- European glass lizard
- False gharial
- Galápagos tortoise
- Gila monster
- Hirasei's land snail
- Japanese common toad
- Japanese fire-bellied newt
- Japanese giant salamander
- Japanese pond turtle
- Japanese rat snake
- Japanese tree frog
- Miyako grass lizard
- Saltwater crocodile
- Tokyo salamander
- West African dwarf crocodile

Aye-aye Forest

- Aye-aye
- Black lemur
- Black-and-white ruffed lemur
- Radiated tortoise
- Ring-tailed lemur

Panda Forest

- Golden pheasant
- Lady Amherst's pheasant
- Red panda
- Temminck's tragopan

Small Mammal House

- Aardvark
- Bonin flying fox
- Brush-tailed rat kangaroo
- Cape hyrax
- Cotton-top tamarin
- Eurasian harvest mouse
- Lesser bushbaby
- Naked mole-rat
- Pallas's cat
- Pygmy slow loris
- Ryukyu flying fox
- Short-beaked echidna

Children's Zoo STEP

- Alpaca
- Crested porcupine
- Domestic horse
- Domestic rabbit
- Emu
- Eurasian oystercatcher
- Goat
- Guinea pig
- Inca tern
- Striped skunk

Miscellaneous

- African penguin
- American flamingo
- Cackling goose
- Collared peccary
- Oriental stork
- Shoebill

== See also ==
- Faithful Elephants, story of the elephants in the zoo during World War II
- Tama Zoological Park
- Tokyo Sea Life Park
