= Animal diplomacy =

Diplomatic animal usage

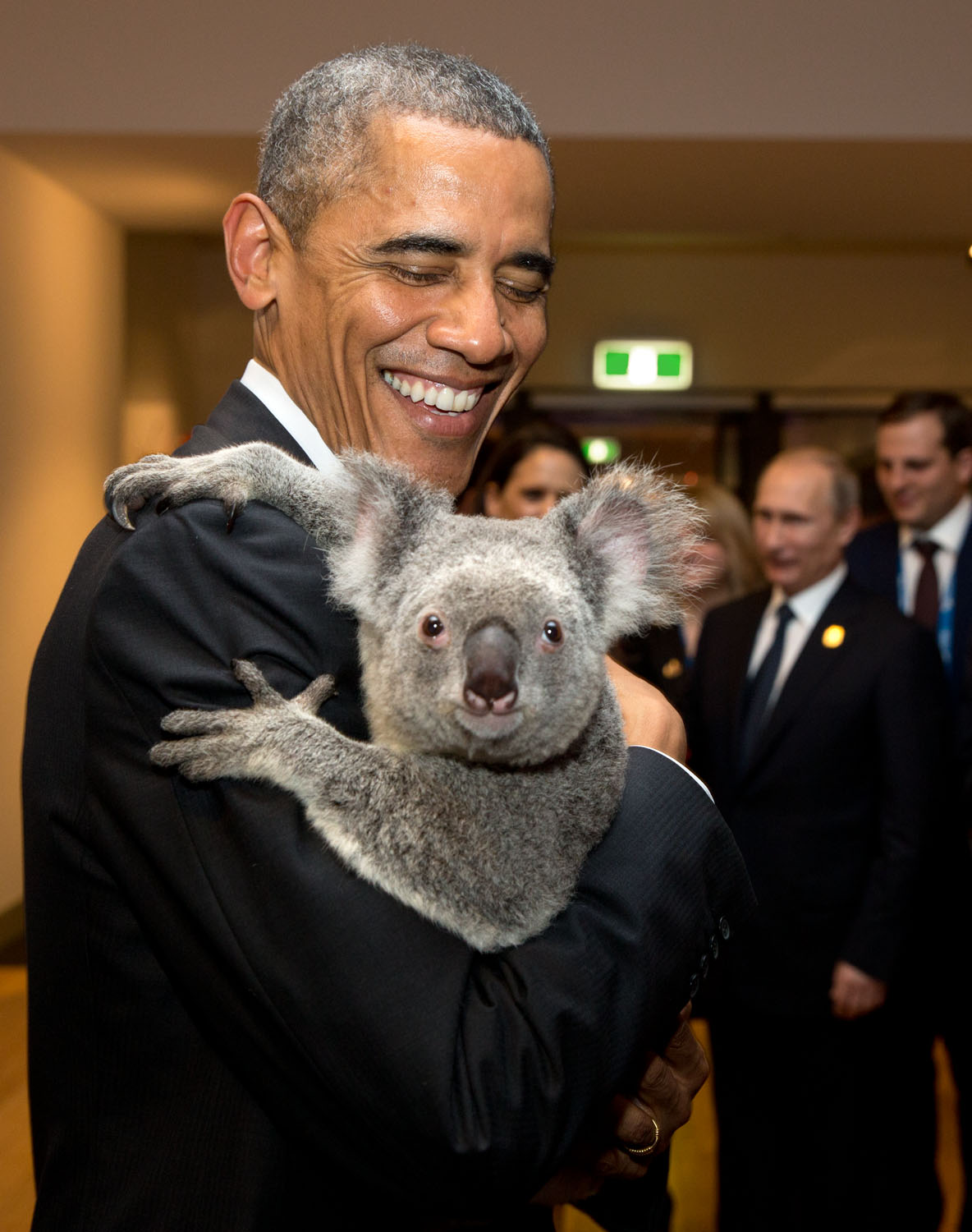
The former President of the United States, Barack Obama, holding a koala in his arms during a photo session organized by the Australian Government for visiting heads of state at the G20 Summit in 2014 in Brisbane. The event, widely covered globally, drew attention to Australia's "koala diplomacy."

Animal diplomacy refers to the use of living animals by governments in their international relations. Attested since antiquity, this diplomacy traditionally took the form of exotic animals (lions, elephants, giraffes, etc.) or domestic animals (horses, dogs, birds of prey) offered as gifts between heads of state. From the 20th century onwards, it has been increasingly perceived as a form of soft power and has been integrated by some states into their public diplomacy strategies; the most famous example being panda diplomacy practiced by China.

During the Cold War, animal diplomacy started to become a noticeable element when it came to environmental engagement. It was seen as a soft-power move among rival nations. Endangered species were being used to signal goodwill and to open diplomatic routes & communication. Historians have shown that environmental diplomacy between the United States and the Soviet Union increased in the late twentieth century. Meanwhile, conservation initiatives were serving as a diplomatic tool for cooperation. These initiatives would include discussions around endangered species plans and what is needed when it comes to scientific research. Some of these Conferences would be strategically planned in locations where they would motivate these countries to be involved. The International Union for Conservation of Nature (IUCN) had its general assembly in Warsaw in 1960. Contacts between the Western & Soviet representatives carried on in international conferences regarding endangered species & natural resources going into the 1970s. This helped establish relationships between powers, despite the tensions between their ideological differences. In modern times like the twentieth and twenty-first century we see a variety of species being traded. In the 20th century, there is a historic exchange between the Soviet Union and the United States as they give the U.S Przewalski’s horse to the San Diego Zoo in 1982. This collaboration had led to 157 endangered Prezwalkskis horses to be born at the San Diego Zoo and the San Diego Zoo Safari Park. Displaying how animal diplomacy can benefit a species on the brink of extinction.

Another species that was being traded among powers during the Cold War was Pandas. Panda diplomacy has been around for centuries. However, it has been very popular in the twentieth & twenty first century when it comes to international relations. In 1972, President Richard Nixon visited China to mend their relationship after years of hostility. This resulted in first lady Patricia Nixon mentioning her interest in Giant Pandas to Premier Zhou Enlai. This later resulted in Premier Enlai gifting two Pandas to the United States. President Nixon selected the Smithsonian Zoo as the institution the bears will live at. The bears Ling-Ling (female) and Hsing-Hsing (male) lived at the zoo for 20 years while symbolizing the collaboration between China and the United States.

== See also ==
- Panda diplomacy
- Vésuve de Brekka, horse given to China by France in 2018
