= Guillermo Valleto's Handwritten Letter to the Treasury Secretary =

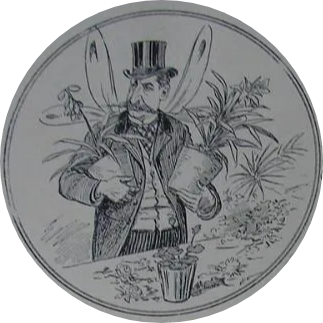
1896 caricature of Valleto

The handwritten letter of Guillermo Valleto to the treasury secretary of July 8, 1899, with regard to the modifications in the Forest of Chapultepec, present day Chapultepec Park in Mexico City. It was from Guillermo Valleto to treasury secretary José Yves Limantour.

During the rule of Porfirio Díaz in Mexico, construction projects were begun in the city to enhance its aesthetic and civic appeal. This letter refers to a Chapultepec Park project.

== Letter's contents ==
The letter details the installation of park lamps, garden enhancements, and other maintenance that took place in the Forest of Chapultepec, including acquisitions made by the Chapultepec Zoo.
