= Panda diplomacy =

China's use of giant pandas as diplomatic tools

Panda diplomacy (Chinese: 熊猫外交) is the practice of sending giant pandas from mainland China to other countries as a tool of diplomacy and wildlife conservation. From 1941 to 1984, the Republic of China and later, the People's Republic of China (PRC) gifted pandas to other countries. Since 1984, they have been leased rather than gifted due to policy change in the country.

== History ==
=== Pre-1950s ===
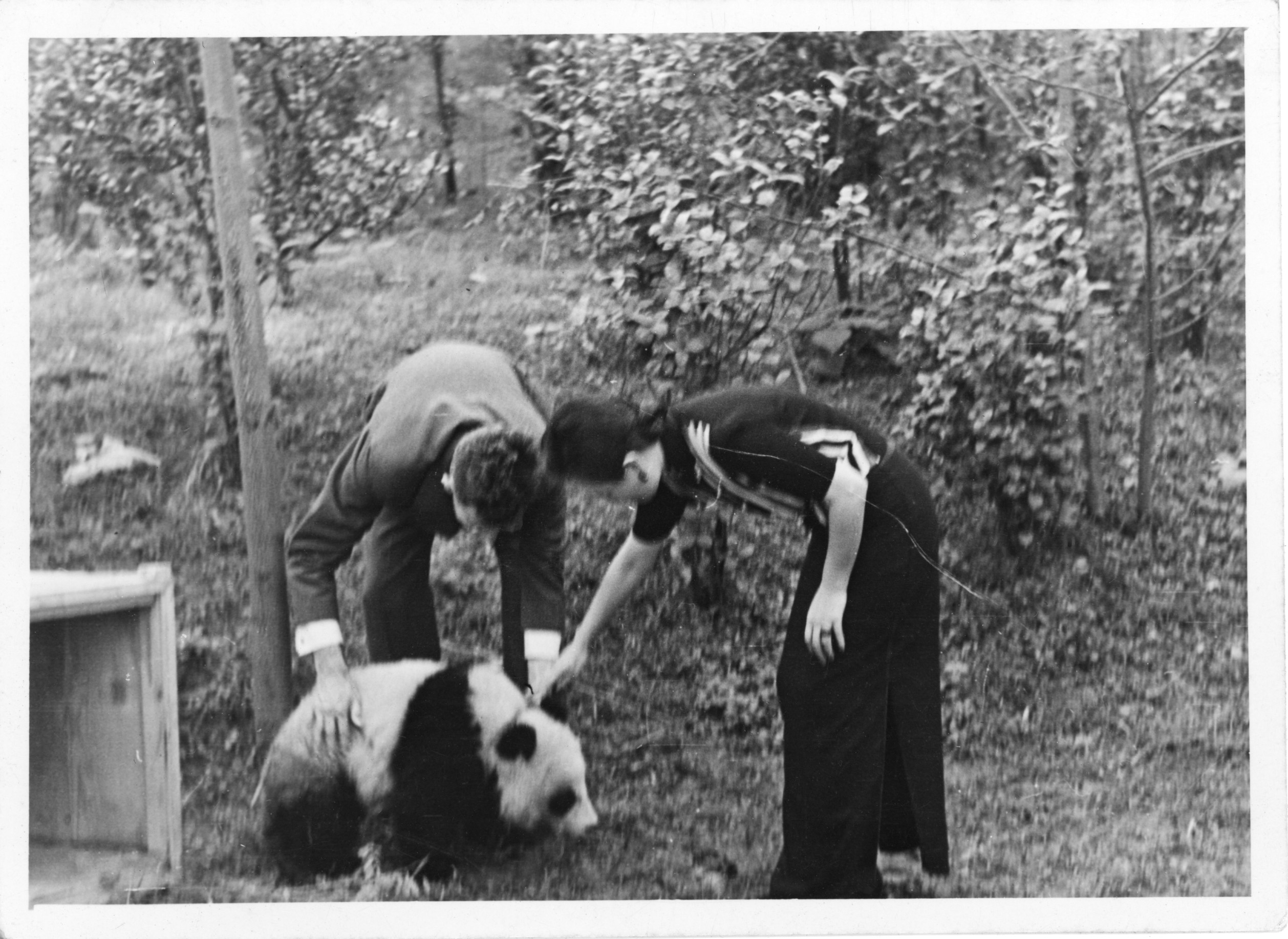
Madam Chiang and John Tee-Van of the Bronx Zoo, U.S., with a baby panda in Madam Chiang's yard in Chongqing, November 9, 1941

While there are few ancient records of the giant panda, according to David Crockett Graham, Szechuanese and Tibetan aborigines sent skins of the ''bei-shung", which he believed to be the giant panda, to the Chinese government during the Qing dynasty. The first instance of panda diplomacy in the modern era was arranged by Soong Mei-ling, also known as Madame Chiang, in 1941 during the Second Sino-Japanese War. China was under siege by Japan, and the U.S. had been sending aid to the Kuomintang (Nationalist Government) in China. Madame Chiang wanted a dramatic way of saying thank you. Pandas had been previously sent to the U.S., including one named Su Lin sold to the Brookfield Zoo in Chicago by Ruth Harkness in 1937, a second one named Mei-Mei brought back by Harkness in 1938 and also sold to the Brookfield Zoo, one named Pandora sent to the Bronx Zoo by David Crockett Graham in 1938, and a second named Pan sent to the Bronx Zoo in 1939. Besides the two pandas sent to the Bronx Zoo, Graham had also collected several skins and skeletons that were sent to the Smithsonian.

In the summer of 1941, Madame Chiang enlisted David Crockett Graham to capture a live giant panda. His friend was able to buy a panda from a local official. Another was captured by one of seven groups of hunters the men had organized. After spending some time at Graham's house in Chengdu, they were brought to Chongqing for a formal handover to a representative of the Bronx Zoo. William J. Dunn, a CBS radio reporter, was in Chongqing at the time and was enlisted to emcee the ceremony, which would air on XGOY, "The Voice of China", and CBS Radio. To ensure the program aired during prime time in the U.S., it originated from Chongqing at 4 a.m. local time. Annalee Whitmore, then working as publicity manager for United China Relief, interviewed the participants and wrote the transcript. The broadcast was to include Madame Chiang, her sister Soong Ai-ling, also known as Madame Kung, David Crockett Graham, and John Tee-Van from the Bronx Zoo. The plan was to transmit the XGOY signal to an RCA communications centre in Manila and then on to San Francisco; however, on the morning of November 9, 1941, the engineers were unable to confirm reception from Manila. The broadcast began as planned, but atmospheric conditions prevented the broadcast from reaching the United States.

The pandas were flown to Hong Kong at nighttime, and from there, they were flown to the Philippines on Pan Am's Hong Kong Clipper. From there, they took a circuitous six-week route by ship to San Francisco. While they were en route, Pearl Harbor was bombed; when they arrived in San Francisco in late December 1941, the giant pandas were not at the top of the news as was originally hoped. The bears were officially received by the Bronx Zoo on December 30, 1941, and five months later, following a national contest, they were named Pan Dee and Pan Dah by 11-year-old Nancy Lostutter of Columbus, Indiana.

=== Post-1950s ===
While the Republic of China used giant pandas for diplomatic means as early as 1941, the People's Republic of China began to use panda diplomacy more prominently in the 1950s and has continued the practice into the present day. Between 1957 and 1983, 24 pandas were given as gifts to nine nations as gestures of friendship. In 1957, the Soviet Union received the first panda "goodwill ambassadors," followed by the Democratic People's Republic of Korea in 1965 as Chairman Mao Zedong sought to strengthen ties with China's communist allies. Pandas were sent to the Soviet Union again in 1959 and to North Korea four more times by 1980. As diplomatic ties were established, pandas were gifted to the United States of America and Japan in 1972, France in 1973, the United Kingdom in 1974, Mexico in 1975, Spain in 1978, and West Germany in 1980.

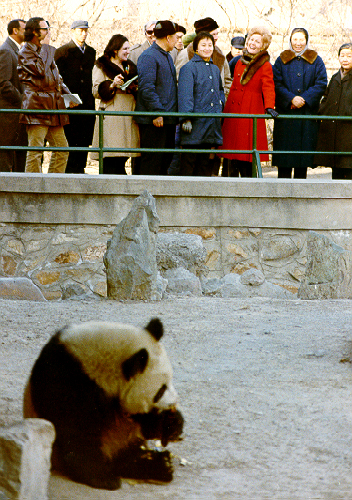
U.S. First Lady Pat Nixon viewing the Beijing Zoo panda exhibit in February 1972

When President Nixon visited China in 1972, Mao Zedong promised to send two pandas, Ling-Ling and Hsing-Hsing, to an American zoo. In exchange, Nixon gave two musk oxen to the Chinese. The mutual gifts illustrated the growing diplomatic relationship between China and the United States at the time. Despite the long history of panda diplomacy, the arrival of the pandas in 1972 marked the first time a panda had been in the United States in over twenty years.

Upon the pandas' arrival in April 1972, First Lady Pat Nixon donated them to the National Zoo in Washington, D.C., where she welcomed them in an official ceremony. Over 20,000 people visited the pandas the first day they were on display, and an estimated 1.1 million visitors came to see them the first year they were in the United States. The pandas were wildly popular and China's gift was seen as an enormous diplomatic success, evidence of China's eagerness to establish official relations with the U.S. It was so successful that British Prime Minister Edward Heath asked for pandas for the United Kingdom during a visit to China in 1974. Pandas Chia-Chia and Ching-Ching arrived at the London Zoo a few weeks later. The pandas gifted to the UK would later be the inspiration for the logo of the World Wildlife Fund.

=== Mexico ===
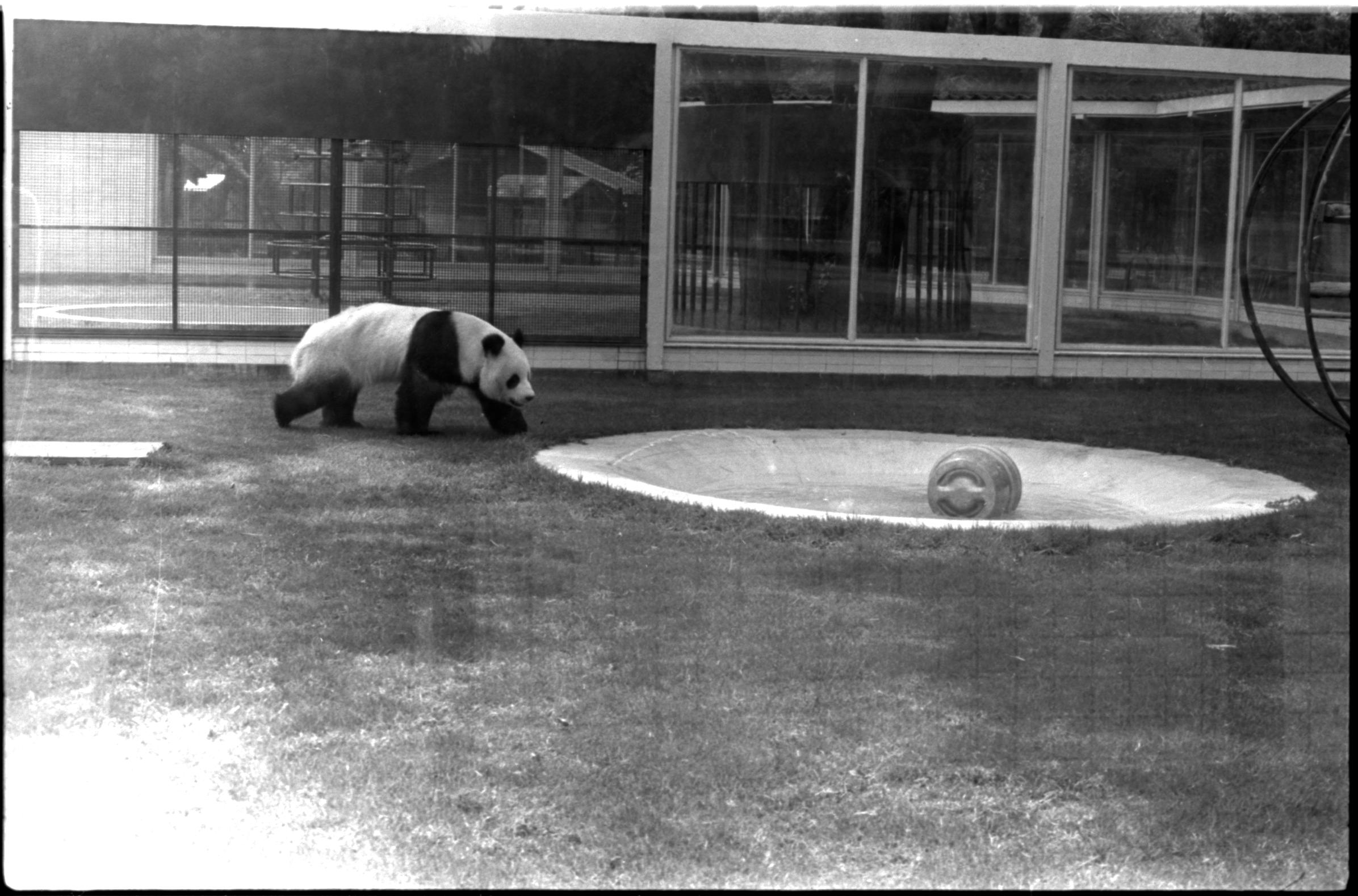
One of the gifted pandas at Chapultepec Zoo, July 24, 1978

Mexico and the PRC established formal relations on February 14, 1972. On September 10, 1975, two pandas, Pe Pe (male) and Ying Ying (female), were gifted to Mexico as a sign of friendship by Mao Zedong following the April 1973 state visit to China by President Luis Echeverría. The pandas were delivered by Vice Premier of the State Council Chen Yonggui and received by First Lady María Esther Zuno. They were housed at Chapultepec Zoo. The zoo became the first institution outside China to successfully breed pandas. Although China shifted from panda gifts to a policy of high-priced loans in 1984, Mexico has retained ownership of the locally born pandas since their lineage traces to gifted pandas.

On August 10, 1980, Pe Pe and Ying Ying had Xen Li, the first panda born outside China, but she died eight days later after Ying Ying crushed her in her sleep. The following year, the couple had Tohui, who mothered Xin Xin with London Zoo's Chia Chia. As of 2024, Xin Xin is the last living giant panda not owned by China. In 1983, the couple had Liang Liang. Ying Ying gave birth to two sets of twins: an unnamed cub and Xiu Hua in 1985, and Ping Ping and Shuan Shuan in 1987.

=== Post-1984 ===
In 1984, Chinese leader Deng Xiaoping modified the policy, such that subsequent pandas would be leased, instead of gifted, beginning with China presenting two pandas to Los Angeles during the 1984 Summer Olympics for $50,000 per month per panda. Short-term loans of the pandas for exhibition purposes became increasingly common. The loans were typically for 100 to 200 days with fees ranging from $300,000 to $500,000. In 1988, concerns over the welfare of the pandas resulted in lawsuits in the United States challenging the importation criteria. While China was not a party to the lawsuits, officials were sensitive to the issues raised, including that breeding-age females had been sent to American zoos on short-term loans. Earlier in the year, they had announced the recovery of the pelts of 146 giant pandas, representative of about fifteen percent of the total population.

The following month, the listing of the giant panda under the Convention on International Trade in Endangered Species (CITES) had been changed from Appendix III to Appendix I, the highest level of protection. China indicated they would make breeding a priority, reorganize and improve the breeding program, and create a national association to oversee the panda program rather than the loans being handled by bureaucrats and individual Chinese zoos. Under additional pressure from Chinese conservationists, they acknowledged the short-term loan program was harmful to the critically endangered pandas and ended the program. China pivoted to long-term leases and began to offer pandas to other nations only on a ten-year lease. The standard lease terms include a fee of up to US$1 million per year and a provision that any cubs born during the lease period be the property of the People's Republic of China. The gifting of two pandas to Hong Kong in 2007 was ostensibly an exception to this lease model, but can be seen as outside of the spectrum of panda diplomacy.

After the 2008 Sichuan earthquake, which severely damaged many facilities, 60 pandas required new housing. The majority were given to nations that had favourable trade agreements with China or those that supplied China with necessary resources, such as uranium from Australia. By the 2020s, the leasing agreements would forbid the zoos from discussing their agreements using words such as "lease", "loan", "rental", or "contract". The approved term is "cooperative research and breeding agreement". Zoo officials are also prohibited from discussing the leasing fees and must cover travel expenses and provide a daily stipend to Chinese experts to come to the zoo to give advice or conduct research. After a panda's declining health was visible via a webcam in 2023, restrictions were placed on video streaming, including the footage having to be reviewed and potentially edited before it is made available to the public.

=== Taiwan ===
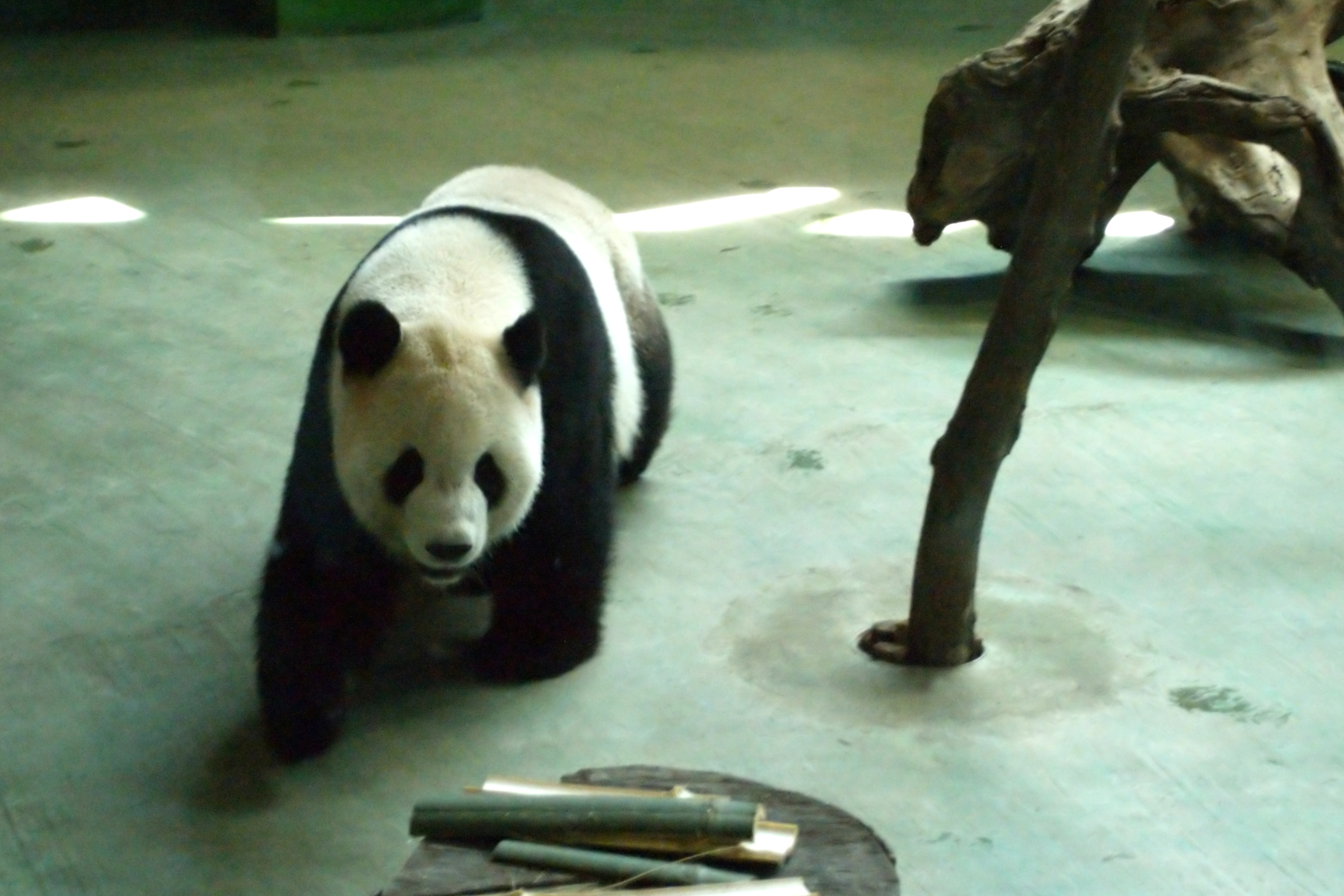
Giant panda at the Taipei Zoo

In 2005, Lien Chan, Chairman of the Kuomintang, the then opposition party in Taiwan, visited mainland China. As part of the talks between Lien and the CCP, two pandas (later named Tuan Tuan and Yuan Yuan, meaning "reunion" in Chinese) were offered as a gift to the people of Taiwan. The offer was opposed by the Republic of China (ROC) government of Taiwan, then led by the Democratic Progressive Party (DPP), which opposes unification with the People's Republic of China. The gift of pandas was seen as an attempt by the CCP to draw the ROC government into its "united front". While several zoos in Taiwan made bids to host the pandas, the ROC government raised objections, ostensibly because pandas were not suited to the Taiwanese climate and Taiwan did not have the expertise to rear pandas successfully. It was widely understood, however, that these were pretexts underlaid by political considerations by the DPP-led government to maintain its distance from the PRC government.

Another technical issue is a dispute over the applicability of the Convention on the International Trade of Endangered Species (CITES). In 1998, China offered the Republic of China two giant pandas in exchange for wartime peace. The PRC insisted that a transfer from mainland China to Taiwan was a domestic transfer, not subject to CITES, while the ROC government disputed this and would not accept the pandas without CITES procedures. On March 11, 2006, the ROC formally rejected the offer, with President Chen Shui-bian explaining in his weekly newsletter, "A-bian (Chen's nickname) sincerely urges the Chinese leaders to leave the giant pandas in their natural habitat because pandas brought up in cages or given as gifts will not be happy."

Following a change of government in Taiwan, in July 2008, the ROC government led by the Kuomintang stated that it would accept the gift of two four-year-old giant pandas. In December 2008, the government approved the import of pandas under the terms of "species of traditional herbal medicine." Tuan Tuan and Yuan Yuan arrived at Taipei Zoo later in the same month. In response to the transfer, the CITES Secretariat stated that the transfer of the two pandas was a matter of "internal or domestic trade", and so was not required to be reported to CITES. The ROC quickly issued a rebuttal to the CITES statement and insisted that the country-to-country transfer protocols be respected. The ROC also noted that such procedures would not have been needed if it had been an internal/domestic transfer. The ROC further noted that Taiwan is not a CITES signatory and is therefore not obligated to report to the CITES Secretariat its acceptance of the two pandas.

=== United States ===
In the 1970s, the Nixon administration sought to improve U.S.–China relations. Shortly after Nixon visited China in 1972, Beijing sent two pandas, named Ling-Ling and Hsing-Hsing. The female died in 1992 from heart disease and the male was euthanized in 1999 after developing end-stage kidney disease. China has leased out subsequent pandas to the U.S.; however, most of these leases expired by 2024, with the National Zoo returning three giant pandas to China in November 2023.

As short-term panda loans to attract large crowds grew in popularity, potentially endangering the survival of the species, serious conflict arose among professional conservationists. In 1984 and 1985, the Los Angeles Zoo, the San Francisco Zoo and the Toronto Zoo used short term loans. By 1987 and 1988, pandas on short-term loans were sent to five zoos: the Bronx Zoo, Busch Gardens Tampa Bay, the San Diego Zoo, the Toledo Zoo, and, in conjunction with the 1988 Winter Olympics, the Calgary Zoo. Similar loans were in the planning stages at five other zoos – Zoo Atlanta, the Columbus Zoo, Omaha's Henry Doorly Zoo, Portland's Oregon Zoo, and Seattle's Woodland Park Zoo – as well as Walt Disney World and the Michigan State Fair.

Conservationists were further alarmed when the Bronx Zoo accepted a non-breeding male and a breeding-age female panda on short-term loan. The female went into estrus while at the zoo. It would be a year before she would again be fertile for 24 to 36 hours. At the time, captive breeding was seldom successful, including over a period of decades at the Beijing Zoo, and was beginning to be taken more seriously.

The World Wildlife Fund and the American Association of Zoological Parks and Aquariums filed suit to force the U.S. Fish and Wildlife Service (FWS) to cancel the Toledo Zoo's display of breeding-age pandas, which they alleged were solely for commercial purposes in violation of the U.S. Endangered Species Act and the Convention on International Trade in Endangered Species (CITES). The injunction was denied and the pandas arrived for a 100-day stay which was later extended. The FWS did prohibit the zoo from collecting fees for the panda exhibit. Chinese wildlife officials were initially insulted by the dispute, including the FWS questioning how China used the money it received for the loans. It did result in China making policy changes, including ending the short-term loan program that year.

In 1993, the FWS issued a moratorium on the importation of pandas to the U.S. It would be lifted five years later with a new policy in place. To ensure that imported pandas would contribute to the welfare of pandas in the wild in China, the FWS expanded the criteria to obtain an import permit: the import must not be for commercial purposes, it must benefit wild populations through scientific research or propagation, it must not jeopardize the wild populations, and the importer must have facilities and the expertise to care for the pandas. The requirement that the zoo ensure that China will channel more than half of its loan fee into conservation efforts for wild pandas and their habitat was a result of the World Wildlife Fund lawsuit. The criteria also made it unlikely a permit would be granted for a short-term loan.

PRC officials used panda diplomacy in an attempt to scuttle an agricultural trade deal between Nebraska and Taiwan in 2007. After six years of formally pursuing a panda project and raising $55 million to cover the costs, officials at the Henry Doorly Zoo in Omaha, Nebraska were told they were at the top of the waiting list. Just before the state's governor was to leave on a trip to finalize the $400 million trade deal with Taiwan, the Chinese Embassy asked the zoo director to use his influence to have the governor abandon the deal or the zoo would be dropped to seventh or eighth place on the waiting list. The director refused and he was told China was no longer looking for panda loan partners. While the Chinese Embassy has said they have no record of the phone call, the zoo did not receive the pandas. It would be 2024 before a zoo in the United States did.

With U.S.–China relations straining, China began declining to renew panda leases for U.S. zoos in the late 2010s and early 2020s. The San Diego Zoo pandas returned to China in 2019, followed by pandas at the Memphis Zoo and National Zoo in Washington, D.C., in 2023. The Memphis pandas, Ya Ya and Le Le, became a rallying point for Chinese calls to repatriate the bears after accusations of poor living conditions circulated on Chinese social media sites and the sudden death of Le Le in February 2023. A joint team of American and Chinese scientists concluded Ya Ya was suffering from skin disease due to genetic components and fluctuating hormones. The Zoo Atlanta pandas, the last giant pandas remaining in the United States, were returned to China in late 2024. Scholars, including Johns Hopkins University political economist Ho-fung Hung, have questioned whether a deterioration in U.S.–China relations starting in the late 2010s brought an end to panda diplomacy between the two countries.

In a 2023 Washington Post opinion piece, Lonnie G. Bunch III and Ellen Stofan, secretary and undersecretary, respectively, of the Smithsonian Institution, called the return of the National Zoo's pandas "a lesson in cultural diplomacy". They wrote: "Pandas are a vital source of cultural diplomacy—using the arts, science and history to help nations find common ground with the hopes of building on our shared humanity to create a more peaceful world. The pandas were a bridge between the American people and the Chinese people." They concluded: "If we can save this iconic species, then surely, we can work together to tackle some of our greatest challenges, including climate change and preservation of ecosystems around the world."

In early 2024, the China Wildlife Conservation Association announced plans to send a new pair of pandas to the San Diego Zoo as early as that summer, nearly five years after the Zoo returned its pandas to China. The pandas, Yun Chuan and Xin Bao, arrived in late June and debuted to the public in early August.

Following a campaign that included then-Mayor London Breed traveling to China the previous year, in April 2024, she announced from Beijing that the San Francisco Zoo had been selected to receive pandas. The timeline for their arrival depends on the completion of a panda enclosure at the zoo. Two years later, Mayor Daniel Lurie reaffirmed City Hall's commitment to the panda project while also saying it could not be directly funded by the city budget. Cost estimates that include updating the habitat were over $25 million.

In May 2024, the National Zoo announced that two pandas named Bao Li and Qing Bao would become part of the collection by the end of the year. The pandas arrived in October and were quarantined for 30 days to reduce the risk of their passing parasites or diseases to other animals. This also gave them time to get acclimated to their new environment. After some preview days with more limited audiences present, the pandas made their public debut in late January.

In April 2026, the China Wildlife Conservation Association announced that two pandas born in 2020, Ping Ping (male) and Fu Shuan (female), would be sent to Zoo Atlanta under a 10-year conservation partnership agreement that had been signed the previous year. On September 24, during a state visit to the United States where he met with President Trump, Chinese leader Xi Jinping confirmed that China would send the pandas to Zoo Atlanta as an "envoy of friendship." The pandas arrived three days later.

=== Other nations ===
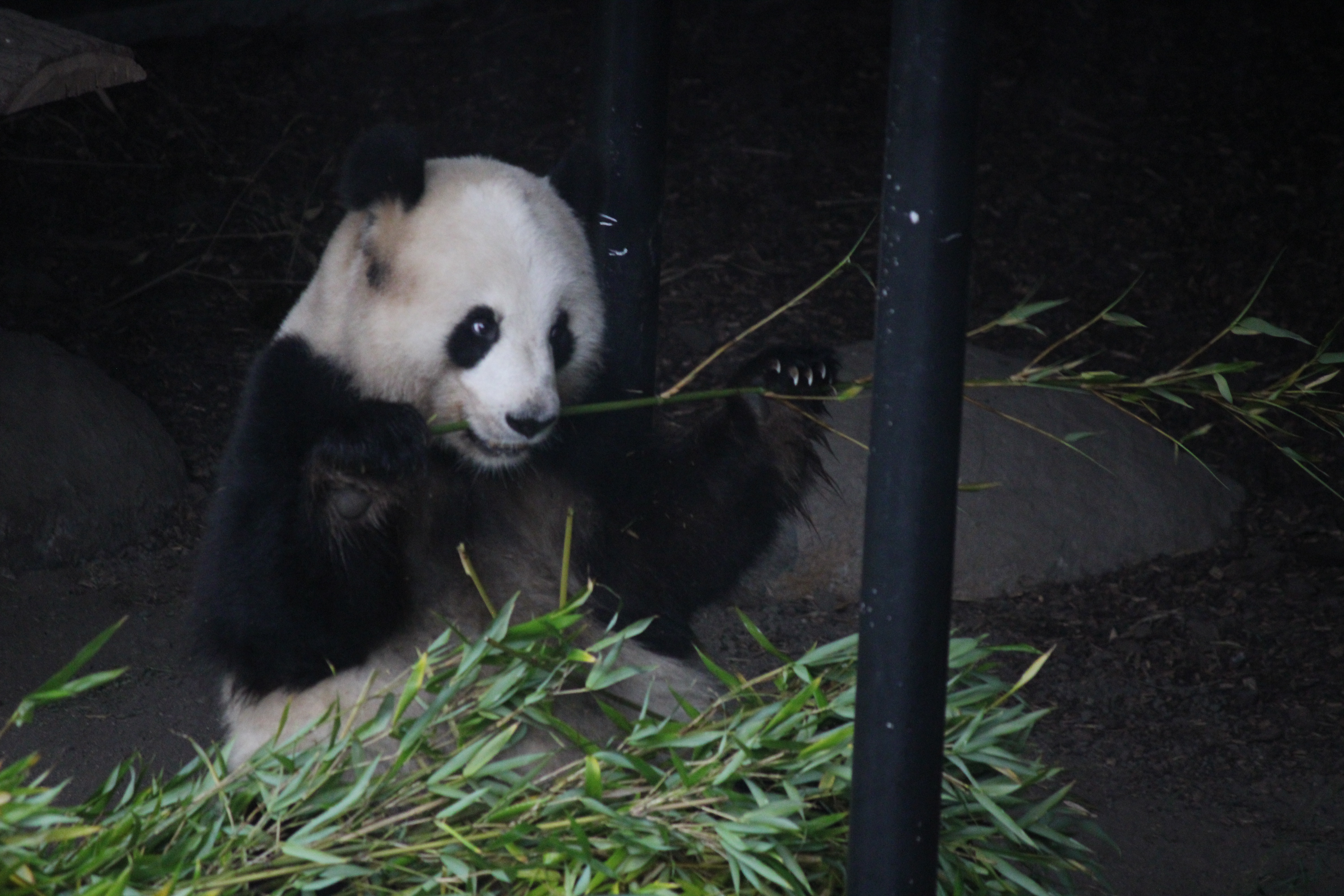
Mao Sun at Copenhagen Zoo in 2025, one of two giant pandas sent to Denmark in 2019

Other countries recognize the significance of pandas as diplomatic symbols, emblematic of the state of relations with China. During a visit by then Chinese Leader Hu Jintao to Japan in May 2008, China announced the lease of two pandas to Japan. The leader was quoted as saying "Giant pandas are very popular among the Japanese, and they are a symbol of the friendly ties between Japan and China." Treatment of the pandas is likewise associated with the relevant foreign policy. For example, in 1964, British diplomats worried that a transfer of a panda from a London Zoo to Moscow would worsen Sino–Soviet relations. In January 2006, U.S. Deputy Secretary of State Robert Zoellick was photographed hugging a five-month-old panda cub during his visit to Sichuan. The Chinese media widely broadcast the image and it was purportedly interpreted as a sign that Zoellick supported better relations between China and the United States.

In 2003, China leased a pair of pandas, Chuang Chuang and Lin Hui, to Thailand's Chiang Mai Zoo. They were so popular with the public that Thai TV's Panda Channel carried a 24-hour live broadcast of the panda enclosure for years. Chuang Chuang was put on a diet in 2007 due to obesity and died in September 2019 as a result of heart failure. Per the loan agreement, the zoo compensated China for his death.

On April 16, 2014, China planned to send a pair of pandas named Fu Wa and Feng Yi to Malaysia to mark their 40-year diplomatic ties, but were postponed following Malaysia Airlines Flight 370. The two pandas later arrived at Kuala Lumpur International Airport on May 21, and were placed at the National Zoo of Malaysia. In 2018, Finland agreed to care for two giant pandas following their endorsement of the one-China policy. They were sent home in November 2024 due to their maintenance cost of €1.5 million a year and lack of government funding. Two pandas, Cai Tao and Hu Chun, arrived in Jakarta in 2017 to be placed in Taman Safari in Bogor as part of the 60th anniversary celebrations of China–Indonesia relations.

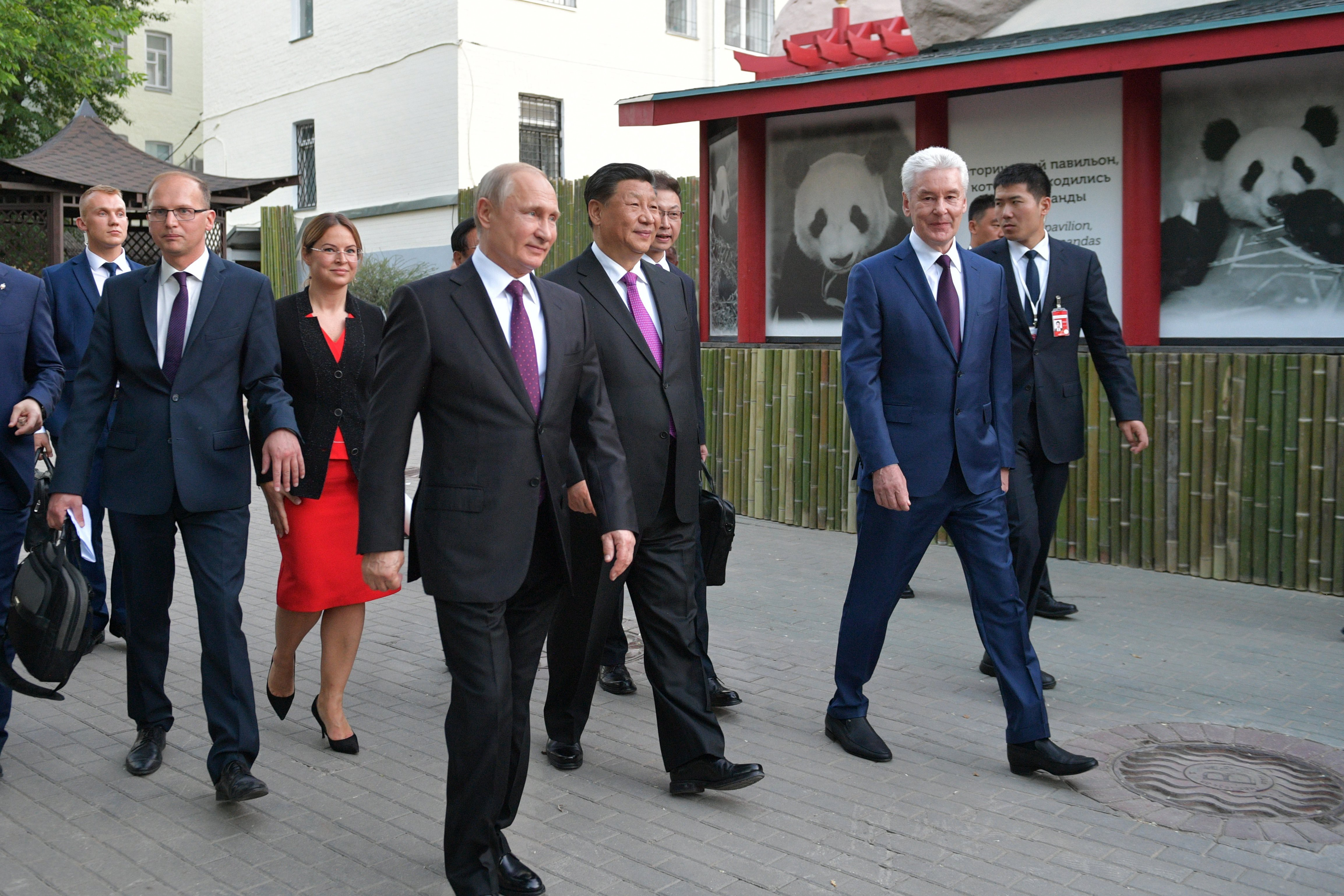
Chinese leader Xi Jinping presented two pandas to Moscow Zoo at a ceremony with Vladimir Putin on June 5, 2019.

In April 2019, after Russian President Vladimir Putin visited Beijing, two pandas were sent to Russia's Moscow Zoo. On June 5, 2019, during an official state visit which emphasized the strengthening ties between the two countries, Chinese Communist Party (CCP) General Secretary Xi Jinping unveiled the pandas to the public. Putin said they were a "gesture of particular respect and trust" and that "we greatly value this gesture of friendship." Ru Yi, a male born in 2016, and Ding Ding, a female born in 2017, were leased to the zoo for 15 years as part of a joint research project.

In December 2023, the only giant pandas in the UK were sent back to China. The pandas, Tian Tian and Yang Guang, were sent to the Edinburgh Zoo in 2011 on a 10-year lease as China expressed a commitment to "take Chinese-Scottish relations to a new level". China had secured deals worth billions of pounds, including Jaguar Land Rover increasing sales to China, an agreement between BP and the China National Offshore Oil Corporation on deepwater exploration in the South China Sea, and an oil refining and petroleum trading joint venture between PetroChina and INEOS Group's refineries in Scotland and France. The zoo made research gains in panda fertility, husbandry, and veterinary care though there were no successful pregnancies. For the two years beyond the original lease, the annual fee was reduced by half to $500,000. As the elderly pandas were scheduled to return, a memorandum was signed by China's Giant Panda National Park and the UK's Loch Lomond and the Trossachs National Park to collaborate on conservation efforts. The deputy director of Giant Panda National Park said the partnership will "further strengthen the cooperation between China and the UK in terms of resources, capabilities, willingness, and determination".

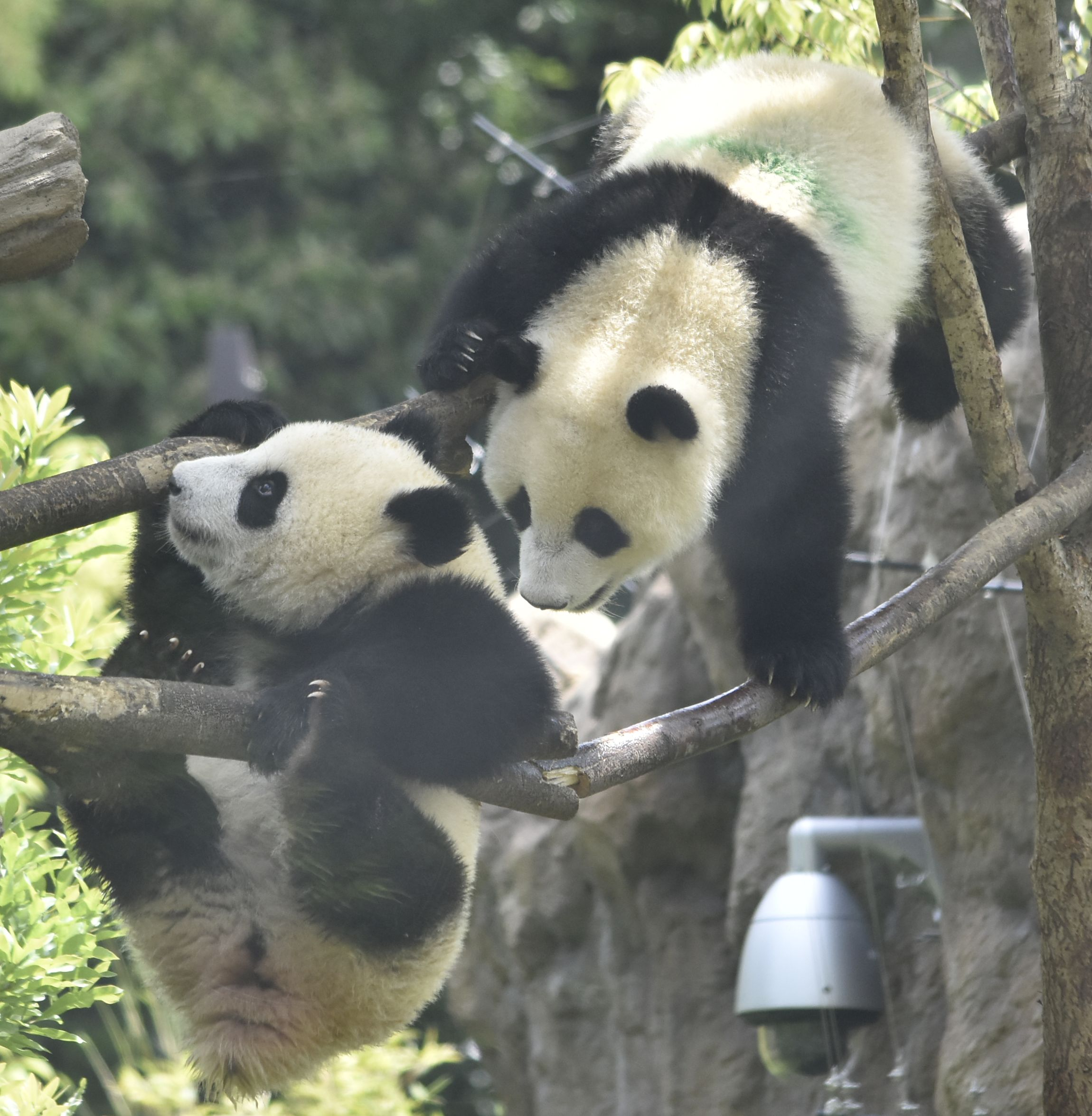
Xiao Xiao and Lei Lei at Ueno in 2022

At the end of 2025, following the onset of a diplomatic crisis between China and Japan regarding potential Japanese intervention in a Taiwan Strait conflict, it was announced that twin pandas from the Tokyo Ueno Zoo would return to China at the end of January 2026, a few weeks earlier than expected. The pandas, Xiao Xiao and Lei Lei, were born at Ueno in 2021. Their parents, Shin Shin and Ri Ri, by then considered elderly, had been returned to China in September 2024. Japan had previously hosted pandas continuously since the normalization of relations between the PRC and Japan in 1972.

== Practicalities ==
Keeping pandas is very expensive. Besides the "rent" payable to China, obtaining enough bamboo is very expensive. A panda typically consumes only fresh bamboo, eating 40 kilograms (88 lb) of it every day. It was reported in 2011 that Edinburgh Zoo spent $107,000 per year to feed its two pandas. This caused the zoo to ask for bamboo donations, as well as for local gardeners to start growing bamboo. During the COVID-19 pandemic, the supply of bamboo added to cost considerations. Owing to the difficulty of securing a consistent and adequate supply of fresh bamboo, Calgary Zoo returned their pair of pandas ahead of schedule, to join their progeny back in China. Due to the high upkeep costs, pandas have been considered a white elephant gift.

== See also ==
- Animal diplomacy
- List of individual giant pandas
- Wolf warrior diplomacy
