= Xin Xin (giant panda) =

Giant panda born in the Chapultepec Zoo (born 1990)

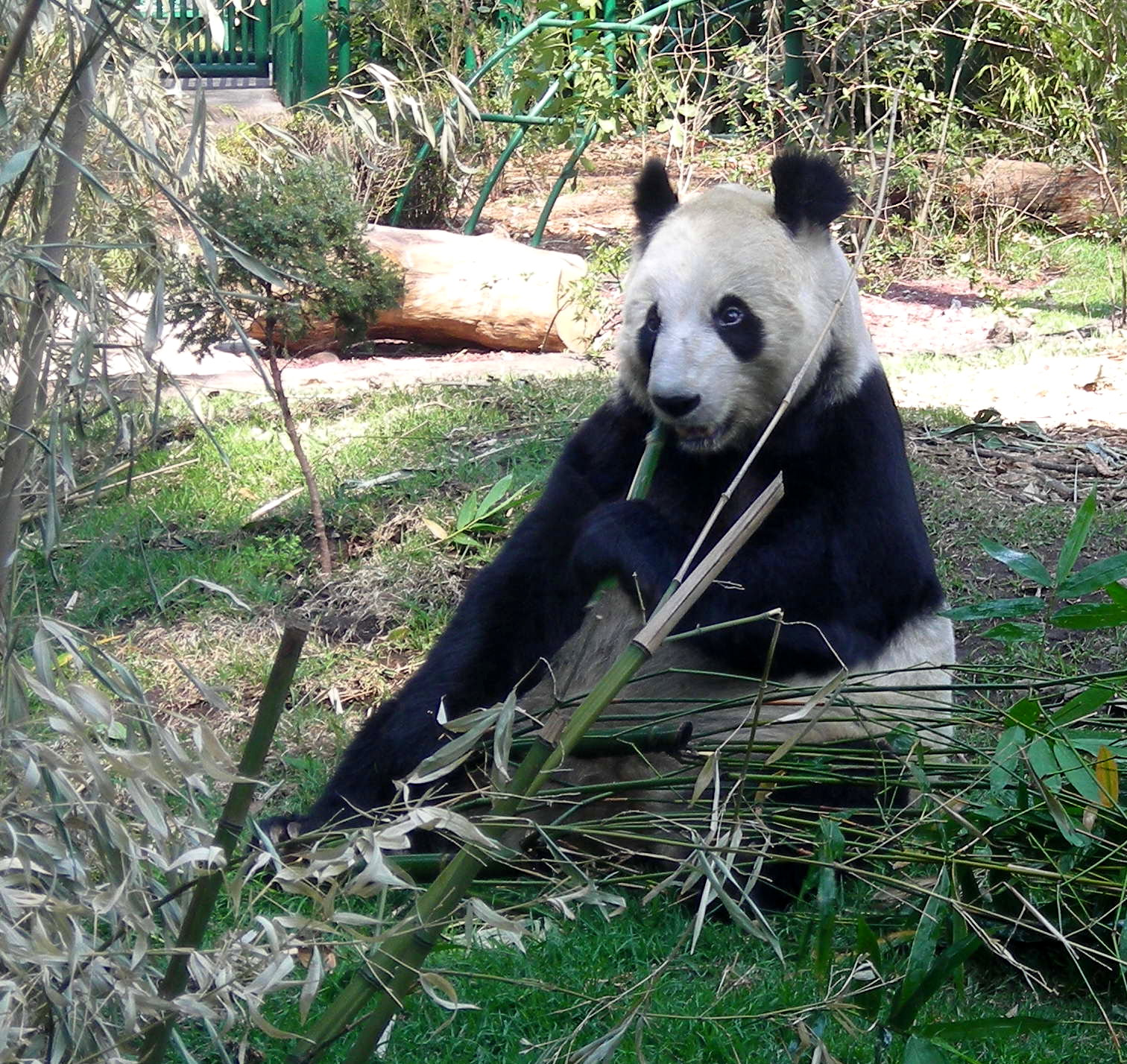
- Xin Xin in Mexico City's Chapultepec Zoo
- Species: Giant panda
- Sex: Female
- Born: 1 July 1990; Chapultepec Zoo, Mexico City, Mexico
- Parents: Tohui (mother); Chia Chia (father)

Xin Xin (Note: Chinese: 欣欣; pinyin: Xīnxīn; lit. 'Hope') (born 1 July 1990) is a female giant panda that lives in the Chapultepec Zoo in Mexico City. She is the daughter of Tohui and Chia Chia, and the only giant panda in Latin America. Despite numerous breeding attempts, Xin Xin does not have any offspring. She is the oldest giant panda who does not live in China, and she has become a symbol of animal conservation and China–Mexico relations. The Chapultepec Zoo celebrated Xin Xin's 35th birthday, which made Chinese and English-speaking headlines. Her longevity has been credited to the Chapultepec Zoo's accommodations for captive giant pandas.

== Life and family ==
Xin Xin was born on 1 July 1990 in Chapultepec Zoo via natural mating. Her mother is Tohui (21 July 1981—16 November 1993) and her father is Chia Chia (c. 1972—13 October 1991), who left London Zoo in 1988 to go to the Chapultepec Zoo in Mexico City. Her grandparents, Ying Ying and Pe Pe, (Note: Pe Pe is also known as Bei Bei.) who are Tohui's parents, were gifted from China to Mexico on 10 September 1975 as an act of panda diplomacy. The gift came before the Chinese government transitioned to a more expensive loaning policy in 1984. Xin Xin had two aunts, Shuan Shuan and Xiu Hua.

Xin Xin is one of three giant pandas in the world that is not considered Chinese property. Instead, she is owned by Mexico. She has been taken care of by zookeeper Joel Frías since 2000. Following the death of Shuan Shuan on 6 July 2022, she became the only giant panda in Mexico and, by extension, Latin America.

=== Breeding ===
The Chapultepec Zoo has had a total of eight giant pandas conceived since Ying Ying and Pe Pe's arrival. The success of the zoo's breeding program has been attributed by some to the zoo's 7300 ft. altitude, similar to the giant panda's natural habitat in Sichuan. As part of a 2010 agreement with Chapultepec Zoo director José Bernal Stoopen, Xin Xin was artificially inseminated annually with sperm from Chinese panda Ling Ling as part of a continuing effort to breed pandas in Mexico. Despite this, Xin Xin has never had cubs.

=== Longevity, birthdays and legacy ===
Xin Xin is the oldest giant panda outside of China, exceeding the species' average lifespan of 15–20 years. Her longevity was attributed to the Chapultepec Zoo's methods to help giant pandas accommodate to the Mexican climate, such as air-conditioned habitats and the addition of nopales to her diet.

On 29 June 2025, the Chapultepec Zoo held a celebration for Xin Xin's 35th birthday. Her birthday made English-speaking headlines, since her age is equivalent to a human being 110 years old. Mexican National Lottery director Olivia Salomon issued a lottery in Mexico with 2.4 million tickets to honor the giant panda's birthday. Nearly 40,000 Mexican citizens participated in the lottery, and the prize of 17 million pesos was drawn on 25 July. Xin Xin's 36th birthday, which featured a cake-cutting ceremony, was scheduled for 27 June 2026, but it was postponed to 4 July. The event attracted visitors from the United States. Furthermore, the act of visiting her became a generational trend, as many visitors who saw Tohui at the Chapultepec Zoo brought their children to see Xin Xin.

Xin Xin has become a symbol of conservation biology due to her advanced age, as well as China–Mexico relations. Since her birthday coincided with the 2026 FIFA World Cup, Chinese artist Wei Xintian created the "Panda Language World Together" exhibition, which featured the "Panda Ball", a giant panda drawn in the shape of a football. As of 28 September 2025, the Mexican government has not said anything about what they will do after Xin Xin dies.

== See also ==
- List of individual giant pandas
- List of individual bears
