= Tohui =

Giant panda born in Chapultepec Zoo (1981–1993)

- Sex: Female
- Born: 21 July 1981; Chapultepec Zoo, Mexico City, Mexico
- Died: 16 November 1993 (aged 12)
- Cause of death: Illnesses
- Resting place: Chapultepec Zoo garden
- Known for: First giant panda outside of China to reach adulthood
- Parents: Ying Ying (mother); Pe Pe (father)
- Mate: Chia Chia
- Offspring: Xin Xin

Tohui or Towi (Chinese: 朵蔚; pinyin: Duǒ wèi; 21 July 1981 – 16 November 1993) was the second giant panda to be born in captivity outside of China, and the first overseas-born giant panda to survive into adulthood. She became a cultural icon in Mexico.

She was the second-born offspring of Ying Ying and Pe Pe; her older sister, Xen Li, was accidentally crushed to death by Ying Ying in her sleep when he was eight days old. After giving birth to a female cub named Xin Xin on 1 July 1990, Tohui developed multiple illnesses and infections that led to her death on 16 November 1993.

== Early life and name ==
Tohui was born on 21 July 1981 at Chapultepec Zoo in Mexico City. She was the daughter of mother Ying Ying and father Pe Pe, a pair of giant pandas gifted to Mexico by the Chinese government on 10 September 1975 as an act of panda diplomacy. On 10 August 1980, the couple had their first offspring, Xen Li, who died eight days after birth after Ying Ying crushed her while she was sleeping. Following the incident, Tohui was isolated from her mother and cameras were installed to further prevent the accident from reoccurring. She was the first giant panda born outside of China to survive into adulthood. In October 1982, following a year of separation, Ying Ying and Pe Pe began meeting every day for the past two weeks. They had multiple other cubs, the youngest of which was a female named Shuan Shuan.

The name Tohui is from Tarahumara (the language of the Rarámuri) and means "(male) child" (variants: tohui, toui, towi). When Tohui was born, it was believed she was male, and the contrary was only learned after a contest for the name was held. The female equivalent is Tehuete. The name was proposed by Parménides Orpinel, a boy from Guachochi, Chihuahua, and was chosen from thousands of submissions by a panel that included Cantinflas. To celebrate her fifth birthday, the Banco de México minted a commemorative coin, where Tohui appeared in the arms of her mother, Ying Ying.

== Later life and death ==
Following her birth, the zoo started to receive considerably more financial support, enough to start its first veterinary hospital. At one point, the line to visit Tohui reached the monument of the Niños Héroes. At the request of the then First Lady, Carmen Romano, a song called "El pequeño panda de Chapultepec" (lit. 'The little panda from Chapultepec') was composed by Laura Gomez Llanos and performed by singer Yuri. The song went on to sell a million copies.

On 1 July 1990, Tohui gave birth to a daughter named Xin Xin, who was conceived naturally with a panda named Chia Chia from London Zoo. Xin Xin was artificially inseminated annually with sperm from Chinese panda Ling-Ling as part of a continuing effort to breed pandas in Mexico.As of July 2025, Xin Xin is the only giant panda living in Latin America, and she never reproduced.

Tohui died on 16 November 1993, at the age of 12, due to a series of infections and illnesses that had affected her since she gave birth to Xin Xin. She was buried in Chapultepec Zoo's garden.

== See also ==
- List of individual giant pandas
- List of individual bears
