= Vésuve de Brekka =

Diplomatic gift to China

Vésuve de Brekka (born 10 June 2009) is a French horse, specifically a bay gelding from the Selle Français stud-book. He was first a service horse in the French Republican Guard, then offered as a diplomatic gift from French President Emmanuel Macron to his Chinese counterpart Xi Jinping in January 2018.

== History ==
Vésuve de Brekka was foaled on 10 June 2009 at the stud of Pierre and Marie-Ange le Boulanger in Colomby, Lower Normandy, France. He was sired by Quartz du Chanu, while his dam, Oréole de Brekka, is by Dollar du Murier. His genetic origin is exclusively in the department of Manche. He was microchipped on 29 September 2009, and was officially registered on 18 February 2011.

He joined the Republican Guard in 2012, at the age of three, after a week of testing, then was placed at the Saint-Germain-en-Laye training center for a year of training. He joined the 3rd squadron at the age of four, and continued his training until age six. He was then considered mentally and physically ready to enter service, starting with escort rehearsals and patrolling in Paris and the neighboring state forests. Due to his qualities, he became squadron head horse and was given his second rider on 14 July 2016. He participated in the parade of the Republican Guard escorting the French president on 11 November 2017.

=== Diplomatic gift to China ===
The Chinese president was "fascinated" by the Republican Guard during his escort between the Invalides and the Elysée in 2014. Emmanuel Macron choose to offer him Vésuve de Brekka, then 9 years old, as an answer to the gift of a couple of pandas by Xi Jinping in 2012, that the Elysée described as an "unprecedented horse diplomacy" (French : diplomatie du cheval inédite). Vésuve de Brekka arrived by air on China on 4 January 2018, accompanied by a veterinarian and groom-rider, the trip being financed by Alain Resplandy-Bernard, PMU interim CEO, with logistical support of the French Union nationale interprofessionnelle du cheval (National Union Interprofessional Horsel). A traditional harness accompanies him, including a military saddle of a 1874 model equipping the regiments of cavalry of the French army, and a light cavalry officer's saber of a 1822 model, adorned with an inscription.

M. Emmanuel Macron – Président de la République Française – Pékin – Janvier 2018

Macron also presented a picture of the animal to the Chinese president and published a video presentation of the horse on his Twitter account. Officials present at the Chinese ceremony emphasize that this is the first time a French president has offered a horse. Vésuve de Brekka must spend a quarantine period in a heated box. This diplomatic gift is accompanied by a partnership agreement between the Republican Guard and the Chinese authorities.

== Analysis ==
According to LCI, a part of the choice of a horse as a diplomatic gift results from the transcription of the name of Emmanuel Macron in Chinese, "Makelong", meaning "the horse defeats the dragon". However, according to Jean-Louis Gouraud, historically, offering a horse is a sign of respect or allegiance. The Times called it a response to the "panda diplomacy" of the Chinese.
