= Ling-Ling and Hsing-Hsing =

Pandas given to the US by China after Nixon's 1972 visit

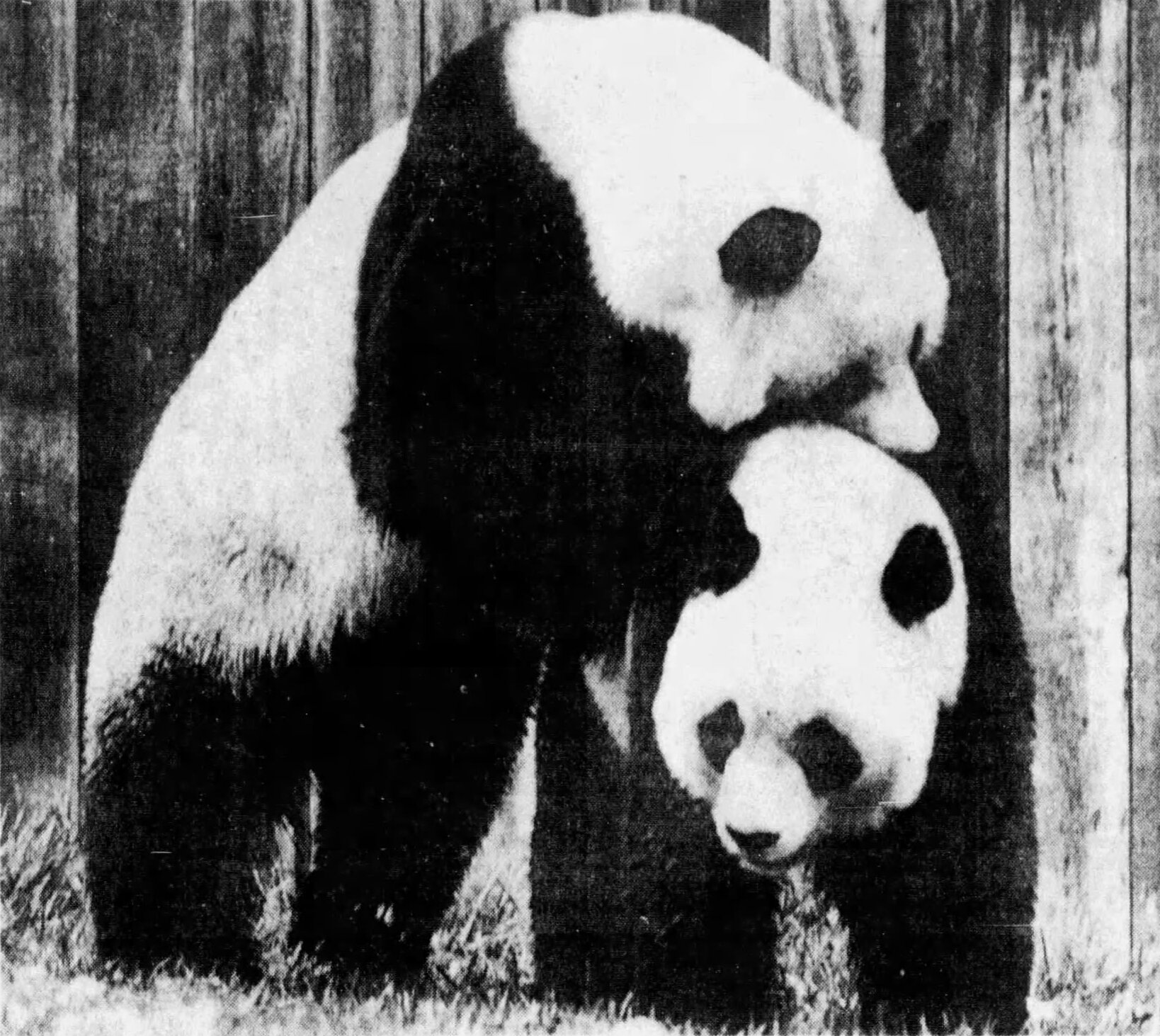
- Ling-Ling (bottom) being playfully nipped by Hsing-Hsing after mating, 18 March 1983
- Species: Giant panda
- Born: China
- Offspring: 5
- Ling-Ling
- Sex: Female
- Born: September 1970
- Died: 30 December 1992 (aged 22)
- Weight: 136 lb (62 kg)
- Hsing-Hsing
- Sex: Male
- Born: August 1971
- Died: 28 November 1999 (aged 28)
- Weight: 74 lb (34 kg)

Ling-Ling (Chinese: 玲玲; lit. 'Darling Girl'; c. September 1970 – 30 December 1992) and Hsing-Hsing (simplified Chinese: 兴兴; traditional Chinese: 興興; lit. 'Twinkling Star'; c. August 1971 – 28 November 1999) were two giant pandas given to the United States as gifts by the government of China following U.S. President Richard Nixon's visit in 1972. In return, the U.S. government sent China a pair of musk oxen. The pandas arrived at Smithsonian's National Zoo on 16 April 1972, since Nixon requested that they have enough time to learn how to have sex. Ling-Ling and Hsing-Hsing attracted millions of visitors annually. Ling-Ling gave birth to five cubs from 1983 to 1989, all of which died shortly after birth.

When Ling-Ling died from heart failure in 1992 at the age of 22, she was the oldest giant panda in captivity outside of China. Her record was surpassed by Hsing-Hsing, who died at the age of 28 from kidney failure.

== Life ==
Ling-Ling was born in 1970, and Hsing-Hsing was born in 1971. The two of them were captured in the wild in 1971. Their names mean "Darling Girl" and "Twinkling Star" in Chinese, respectively.

When the Nixons had a dinner with Chinese Premier Zhou Enlai in Beijing during their 1972 visit, First Lady Pat Nixon mentioned her fondness for giant pandas, to which Zhou replied, "I'll give you some", marking one of the earliest instances of panda diplomacy. In return, the U.S. government sent China a pair of musk oxen. Ling-Ling and Hsing-Hsing were not the first pandas delivered to the United States; in 1949, Soong Mei-ling gifted Pan Dee and Pan Dah to the Bronx Zoo.

=== National Zoo ===
The two pandas did not arrive at the Smithsonian's National Zoo until 16 April 1972, since Richard Nixon requested that the pandas spend more time in China to learn how to mate. Ling-Ling and Hsing-Hsing were formally received four days later at a ceremony attended by Pat Nixon. While at the National Zoo, the pair attracted millions of visitors each year. The two pandas had trouble mating at first, so in March 1981, Ling-Ling was paired with Chia-Chia, the London Zoo's panda, but Ling-Ling was not impregnated, and she was later artificially inseminated with Chia-Chia's sperm. Ling-Ling and Hsing-Hsing had five cubs between 21 July 1983 and 1989, but none of them survived past a few days.

== Later life and death ==
At the National Zoo, doctors detected a potentially fatal kidney problem, which was treated with blood transfusions, in Ling-Ling on 6 December 1983. The following year, she mauled a zookeeper who looked away from her to retrieve some bamboo in her pen.

Ling-Ling died suddenly from heart failure on 30 December 1992; at the age of 22, she was the longest-lived giant panda in captivity outside China. Hsing-Hsing would go on to pass her record when he was euthanized by zookeepers on 28 November 1999, at the age of 28 due to kidney failure. Following Hsing-Hsing's death, the zoo received get-well cards from schoolchildren. Their habitat at the National Zoo, called the Panda House, remained empty for over a year until the arrival of Mei Xiang and Tian Tian from the Wolong National Nature Reserve on 6 December 2000.

== See also ==
- List of individual giant pandas
- List of individual bears

Honorary titles
Preceded by N/A	Ling-Ling: Oldest living giant panda unknown – 30 December 1992	Succeeded by Hsing-Hsing

Honorary titles
Preceded by Ling-Ling	Hsing-Hsing: Oldest living giant panda 30 December 1992 – 28 November 1999	Succeeded by Taotao
