= Pan Dee and Pan Dah =

Giant pandas

- Sex: Male (Pan Dee); Female (Pan Dah)
- Born: c. September 1940
- Died: October 4, 1945 (Pan Dee); October 31, 1951 (Pan Dah)

Pan Dee (Chinese: 潘弟; pinyin: Pān dì or 班棣; Bān dì; c. September 1940 – October 4, 1945) and Pan Dah (Chinese: 潘达; pinyin: Pān dá or 班达; Bān dá; c. September 1940 – October 31, 1951), also spelled Pan-dah, were two giant pandas captured in Western China and settled in New York's Bronx Zoo.

== Life ==
Pan Dee, male, and Pan Dah, female, were born around September 1940 in China. In 1941, Soong May-ling presented the two pandas to the Bronx Zoo in New York. The gift of the two giant pandas was the inception of China's modern "panda diplomacy", and they were used to demonstrate the non-Communist Chinese people's love for the United States, especially for the Bronx. On April 29, 1942, an all-American children's contest to name giant pandas launched by the United States Association for the Relief of Chinese Refugees was announced. The pair of giant pandas were named "Pan Dah" and "Pan Dee".

On October 4, 1945, Pan Dee died of peritonitis. On October 31, 1951, Pan Dah died at the Bronx Zoo.

== See also ==
- List of individual giant pandas
- List of individual bears
