= Chapultepec Zoo =

Zoo in Mexico City, Mexico

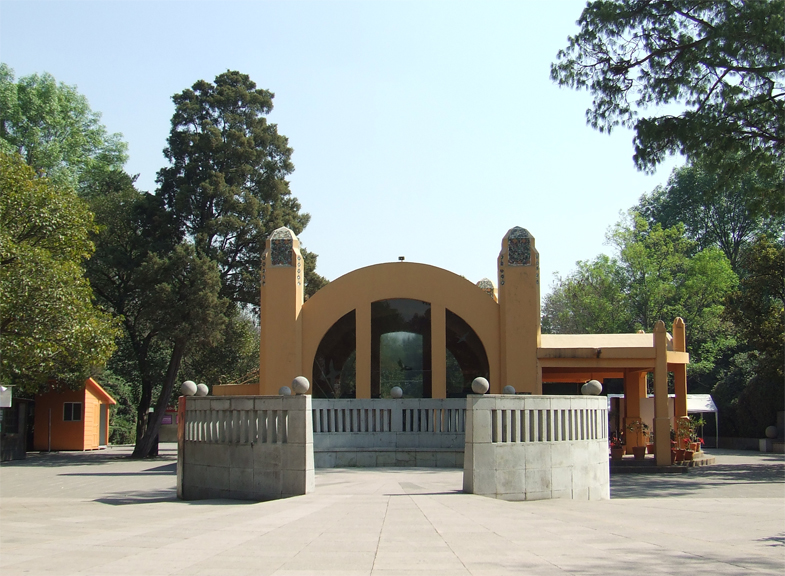
- Zoo entrance (2011)
- Interactive map of Chapultepec Zoo
- 19°25′26″N 99°11′21″W
- Date opened: 1924
- Location: Chapultepec, Mexico
- Land area: 42 acres (17 ha)
- No. of animals: 1930
- No. of species: 250
- Annual visitors: 5.5 million
- Website: data.sedema.cdmx.gob.mx/zoo_chapultepec/

Chapultepec Zoo (Spanish: Zoológico de Chapultepec) is a zoo located in Chapultepec Park; it is one of four zoos near Mexico City, and the best known Mexican zoo. It was founded July 6, 1923, by Mexican biologist Alfonso Luis Herrera using donations from private citizens and governmental funds from the Ministry of Agriculture and Development, and also with funds from the Society of Biological Studies.

The zoo houses almost 2000 animals from more than 200 species. The zoo is known for its success in breeding programs of threatened species, including: giant pandas (first institution outside of China to successfully breed the species in captivity), California condors (first institution outside of the United States to successfully breed the species) and Mexican wolves (first litter of cubs born to released wolves).

== History ==
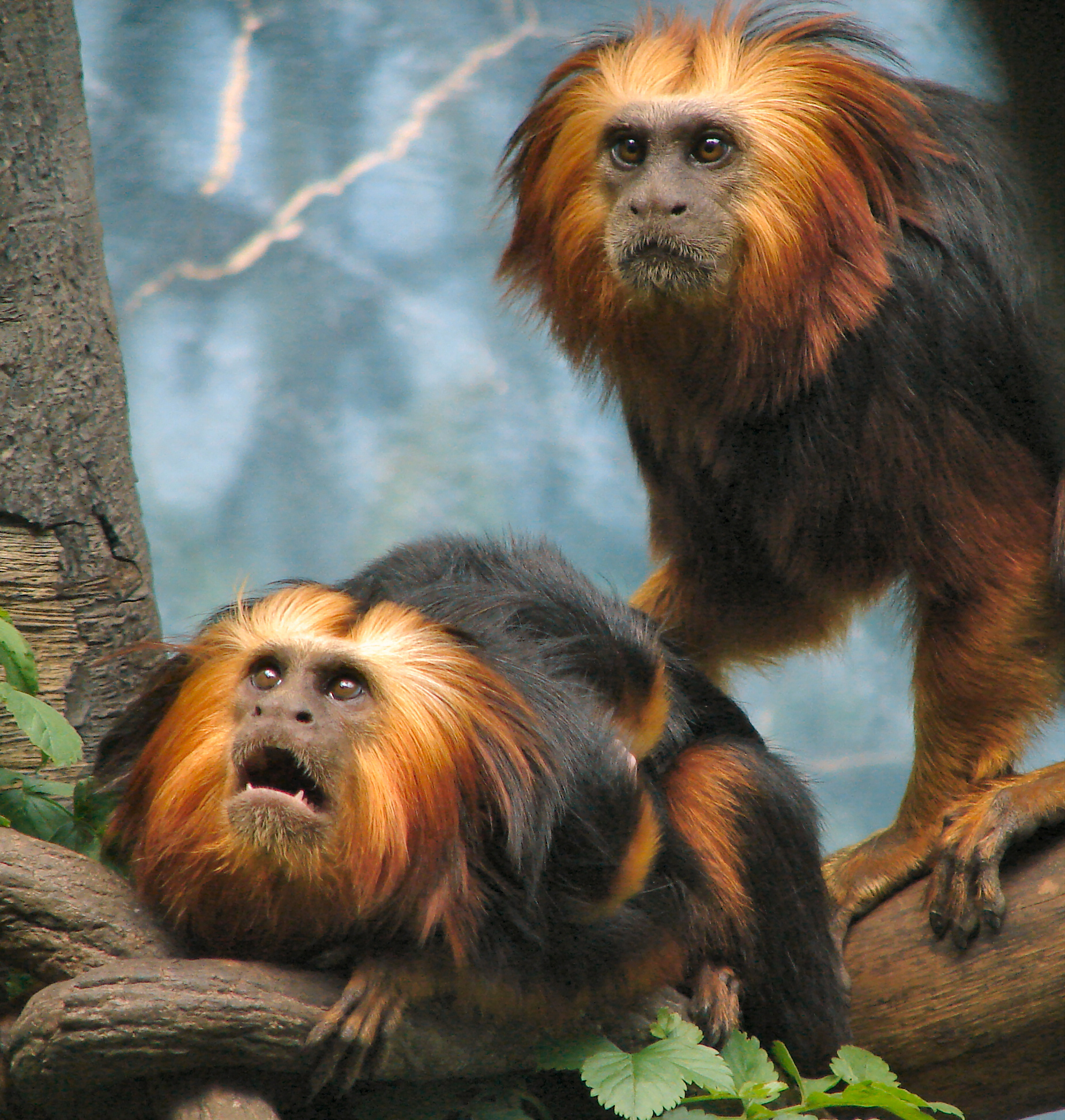
Golden-headed lion tamarin, an endangered species endemic to Bahia, Brazil, at the zoo. Four tamarins are pictured, with two babies clinging to the lower tamarin's back.

The zoo opened in 1924. The biologist Alfonso L. Herrera, founder of Chapultepec Zoo, wanted to recreate the famous zoo and aviary of Moctezuma II. He wanted to exhibit the native species for Mexicans, along with other species from the rest of the world. The collection would include mammals, birds and reptiles, as well as an aquarium.

After several visits to the United States, Herrera obtained the first animals for the zoo, three lion cubs and two American bison. The native animals came from different Mexican states like Sonora, Veracruz and Campeche, while other animals were exchanged with countries like India, France, Peru and Brazil. This first collection consisted of 243 animals.

Between 1950 and 1960, the zoo had the sole purpose of being a place of recreation that exhibited several popular animal species. Ernesto P. Uruchurtu, mayor of the city during that decade, gave new impetus to the zoo, new species were acquired and the entire collection was renovated. Some of the animals that were acquired back then are still in the collection more than half a century later.

The zoo received a pair of giant pandas in September 1975 as a gift from the People's Republic of China. Since then, eight giant pandas have been born in Chapultepec Zoo, becoming the first institution outside of China where captive breeding of this species has been successful.

During the period from June 24, 1992, and August 1, 1994, Chapultepec Zoo was completely remodeled through the project "Ecological Rescue Chapultepec Zoo." A multidisciplinary group including experts in various areas such as designers, engineers, biologists and veterinarians worked in all aspects of the project, seeking to cover the four major objectives of a modern zoo, i.e., recreation, education, research and conservation of wildlife. For over seventy years, the exhibition was classified according to the taxonomic groups: primates, felines, canines, herbivores, birds, reptiles, etc. The concept has changed to reflect the fact that the animals live together in nature, so now are grouped by bio-climatic zones according to their natural habitat. There are four climates, cold and wet (temperate forest and coastal), cold and dry (grassland), hot and humid (tropical rainforest) hot and dry (arid and savanna). Mexico has all these regions, and at the beginning of each exhibit animals native to the country are exhibited. Exhibits were built trying to recreate a natural habitat for each species, which gives visitors a better understanding of nature and provides the animal enrichment.

Chapultepec Zoo houses some important native species that are endangered or threatened such as the volcano rabbit, the Mexican wolf, jaguar, thick-billed parrot, ocellated turkey, axolotl and the red-kneed tarantula.

The Chapultepec Zoo is involved with various conservation projects, using both natural and artificial methods. With this purpose in 1998, a reproductive physiology laboratory was established. The collaboration with national and international institutions is part of the work the Chapultepec Zoo does for the benefit of the conservation of wildlife.

== Animals and exhibits ==
=== Butterfly House ===
- Monarch butterfly

=== Insectarium ===
- Goliath spider
- Madagascar hissing cockroach
- Indian ornamental tree spider
- Red-knee tarantula
- Mexican golden tarantula

=== Sharks ===
- Grey reef shark

=== Desert ===
- Bighorn sheep
- Mexican wolf
- Crested porcupine
- African spurred tortoise
- Aldabra giant tortoise
- Brown hyena
- Bobcat
- Hamadryas baboon
- Bactrian camel
- Dromedary

=== Grasslands ===
- Mandrill
- Senegal parrot
- Meerkat
- Lion
- Mexican prairie dog
- Impala
- Giraffe
- Grévy's zebra
- Grant's zebra
- Grey crowned crane
- Blue wildebeest
- Common ostrich
- White-lipped peccary
- Guanaco
- Hippopotamus
- Egyptian goose
- Waterbuck
- Sable antelope
- Blackbuck
- Black wildebeest
- Red kangaroo
- Eastern grey kangaroo
- Mouflon
- Gemsbok
- Chital
- Nyala
- Axolotl
- Lechwe
- American bison

=== Herpetarium ===
- Reticulated python
- Ball python
- Boa constrictor

=== Dinosaurium ===
- Tyrannosaurus
- Velafrons

=== Coastal strip ===
- Humboldt penguin
- California sea lion

=== Aviary ===
- Thick-billed parrot
- Blue and yellow macaw
- Mute swan
- American flamingo
- Golden eagle
- Emu
- Scarlet macaw
- Andean condor
- Black vulture
- King vulture
- California condor
- Indian peafowl
- Golden pheasant

=== Temperate forest ===
- Patagonian mara
- American black bear
- White-tailed deer
- Western barn owl
- Volcano rabbit
- Snow leopard
- Mottled owl
- Prehensile-tailed porcupine
- Great horned owl
- Corn snake
- Kinkajou
- White-nosed coati
- Red-knee tarantula
- Brown bear
- Common raccoon dog
- Gray fox
- Hudson Bay wolf
- European fallow deer
- Elk
- Maned wolf
- Bengal tiger
- Sika deer
- Japanese macaque
- Giant panda

=== Tropical forest ===
- Jaguar
- Geoffroy's spider monkey
- Capybara
- Great curassow
- Mexican agouti
- Central American red brocket
- Colombian white-faced capuchin
- Black capuchin
- Tonkean macaque
- Siamang
- Spectacled bear
- Bengal tiger
- Common patas monkey
- Mexican spider monkey
- Lion
- Panamanian white-faced capuchin
- Spotted hyena
- Mexican wolf
- Ocelot
- Stump-tailed macaque
- Linnaeus's two-toed sloth
- Cotton-top tamarin
- Ring-tailed lemur
- Nile crocodile
- American crocodile
- Baird's tapir
- Green iguana
- Burmese python
- Southern tamandua

=== Giant pandas ===
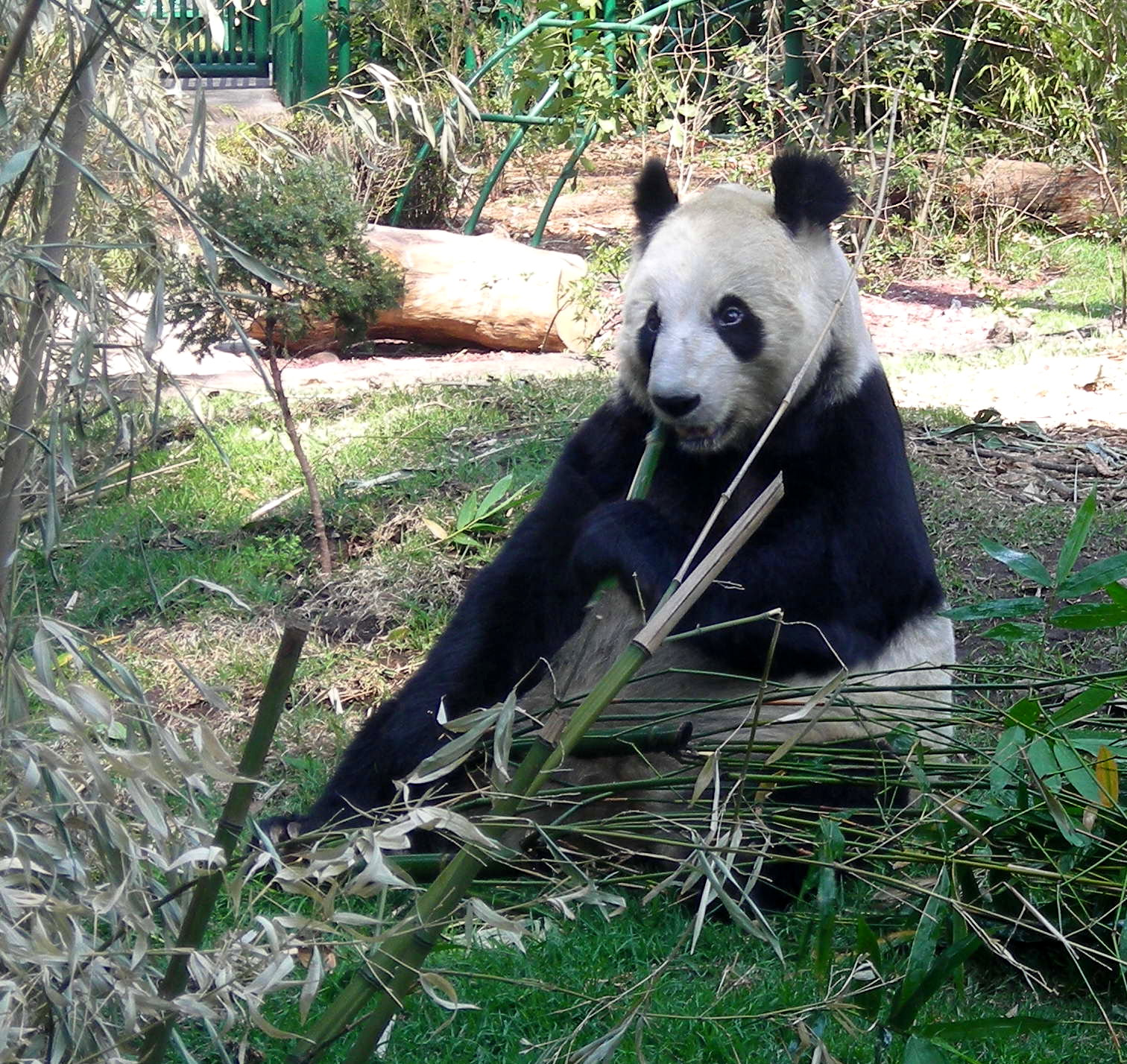
Xin Xin, one of the pandas currently living at the zoo

The zoo is especially famous for its success in giant panda breeding; in 1980 Chapultepec Zoo became the first institution outside of China to successfully breed in captivity the endangered species. In total there have been eight live births at the zoo. The most famous panda to have lived at the zoo has been Tohui. Currently only one female giant panda lives at the zoo: Xin Xin.

The pandas at Chapultepec are special in that China does not have ownership. The original pair were given to Mexico and subsequent pandas have all been born prior to the change in policy from gifting to loaning. Zoo officials have also come to an agreement with China that any new offspring born at Chapultepec will belong to China; however, these pandas will be allowed to stay at the zoo (in contrast to other institutions, where offspring have to be returned to China after reaching five years of age).

The pandas that have resided at Chapultepec Zoo are:

- Pe Pe and Ying Ying were a mated pair of giant pandas donated to the zoo by the Chinese government in September 1975. They had seven cubs. Pe Pe died on July 20, 1988. Ying Ying died on January 29, 1989.
- Xen Li was born in August 1980, becoming the first panda born in captivity outside China. She died after just 8 days when her mother rolled on her in her sleep.
- Tohui was born on July 21, 1981. She became a 'star', even having her own song, "El Pequeño Panda de Chapultepec" (The Little Panda from Chapultepec) performed by Mexican singer Yuri. She died on November 16, 1993.
- Liang Liang was born on June 22, 1983. He died on May 23, 1999.
- Xiu Hua was born in the zoo on June 25, 1985; her parents were Ying Ying (mother) and Pe Pe (father). She died on April 27, 2013.
- Xiu Hua's twin, a male, died on June 27, 1985.
- Ping Ping was the sixth cub to be born at the zoo on June 15, 1987. He died on June 18, 1987.
- Shuan Shuan was born in the zoo on June 15, 1987. Shuan Shuan was loaned to the Guadalajara Zoo from July 8, 2010, until January 18, 2011. She died June 15, 2022, and was the oldest panda in Mexico at the time of her death.
- Xin Xin ("hope" in Chinese) was conceived naturally and was born at the zoo on July 1, 1990. Her mother is Tohui and her father is Chia Chia who was on loan from the London Zoo.

In May 2011, the Mexico City Government announced that the three females at the zoo would be inseminated using sperm obtained from pandas in China.

== Gallery ==
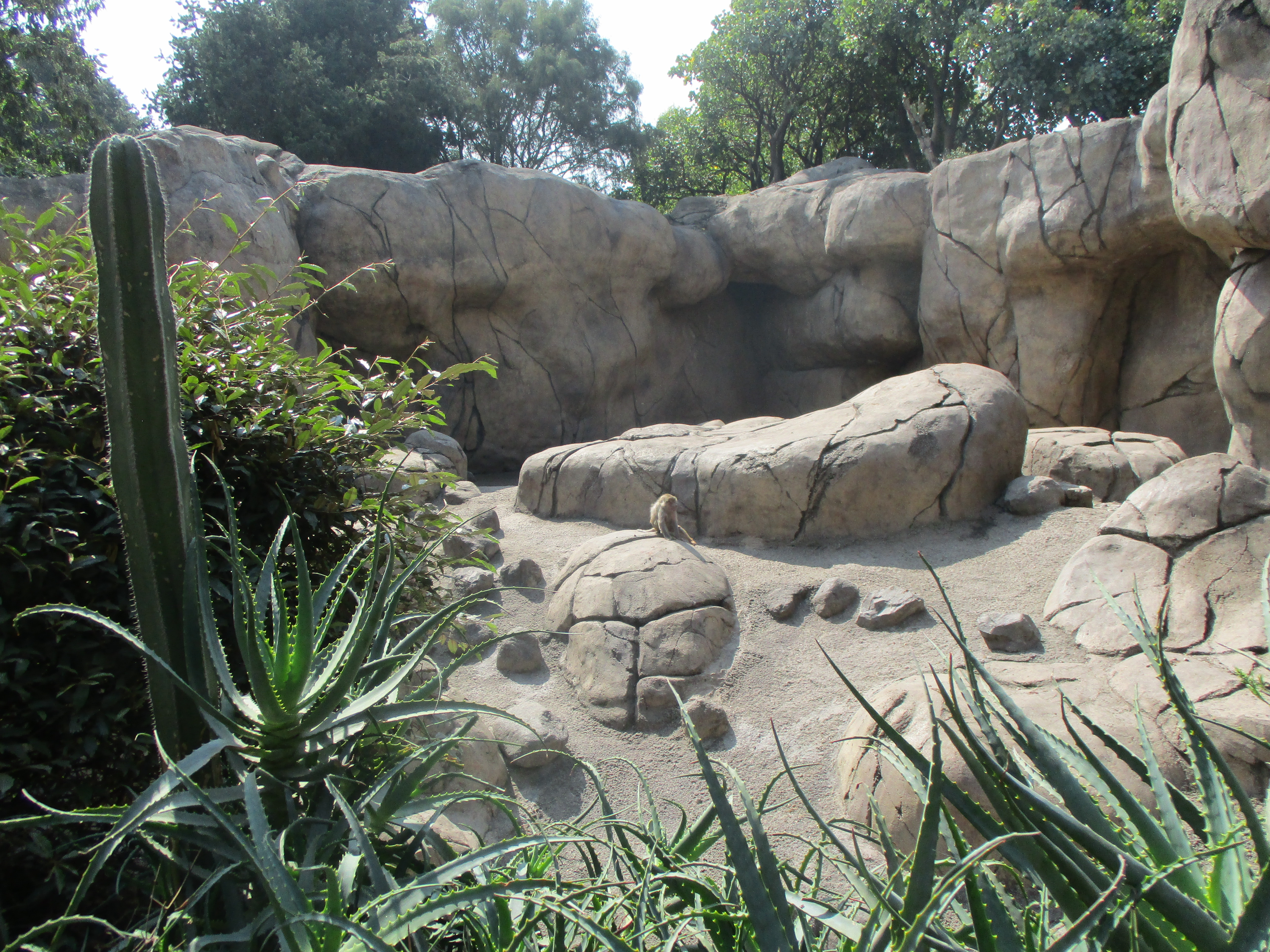

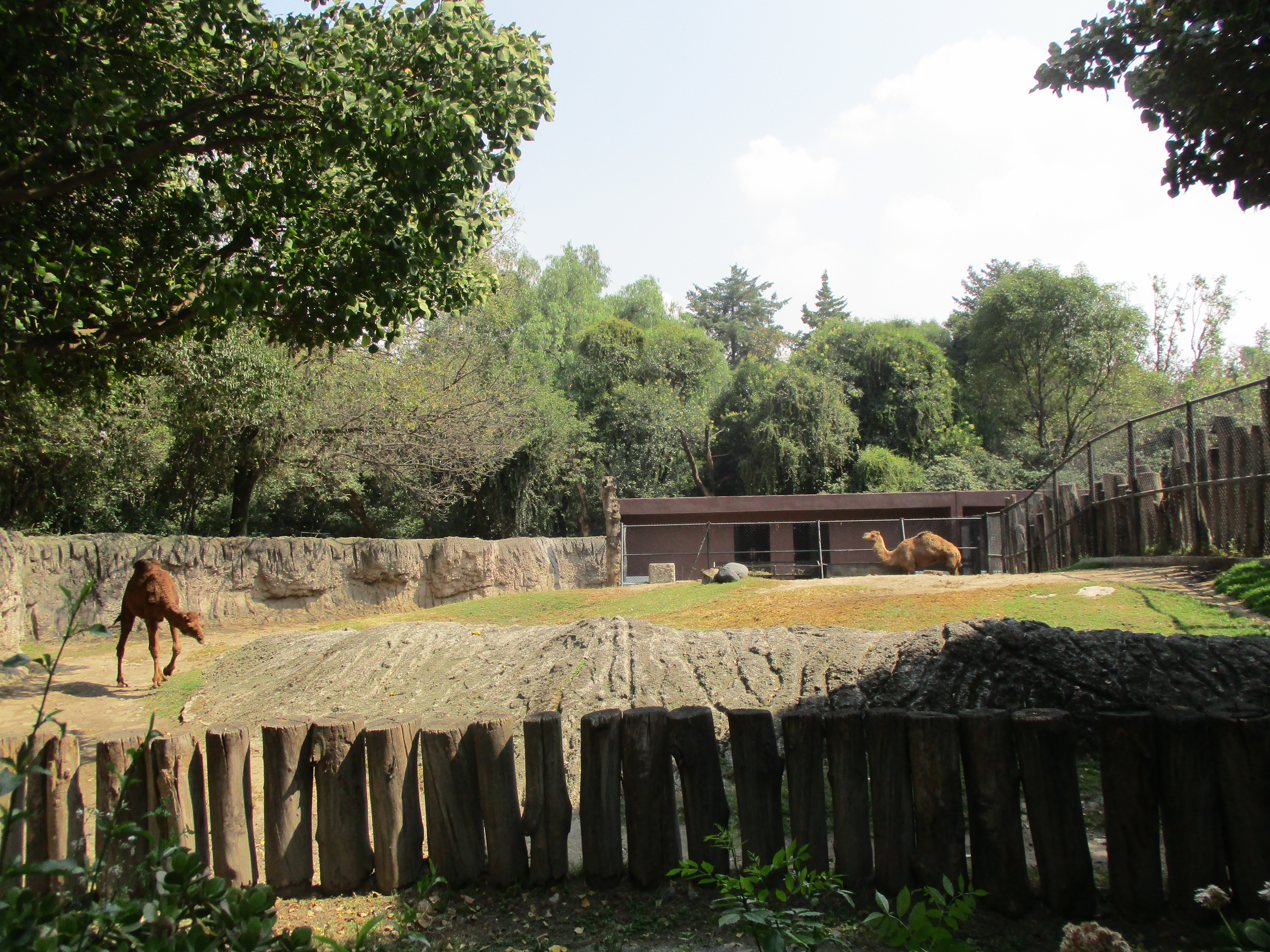

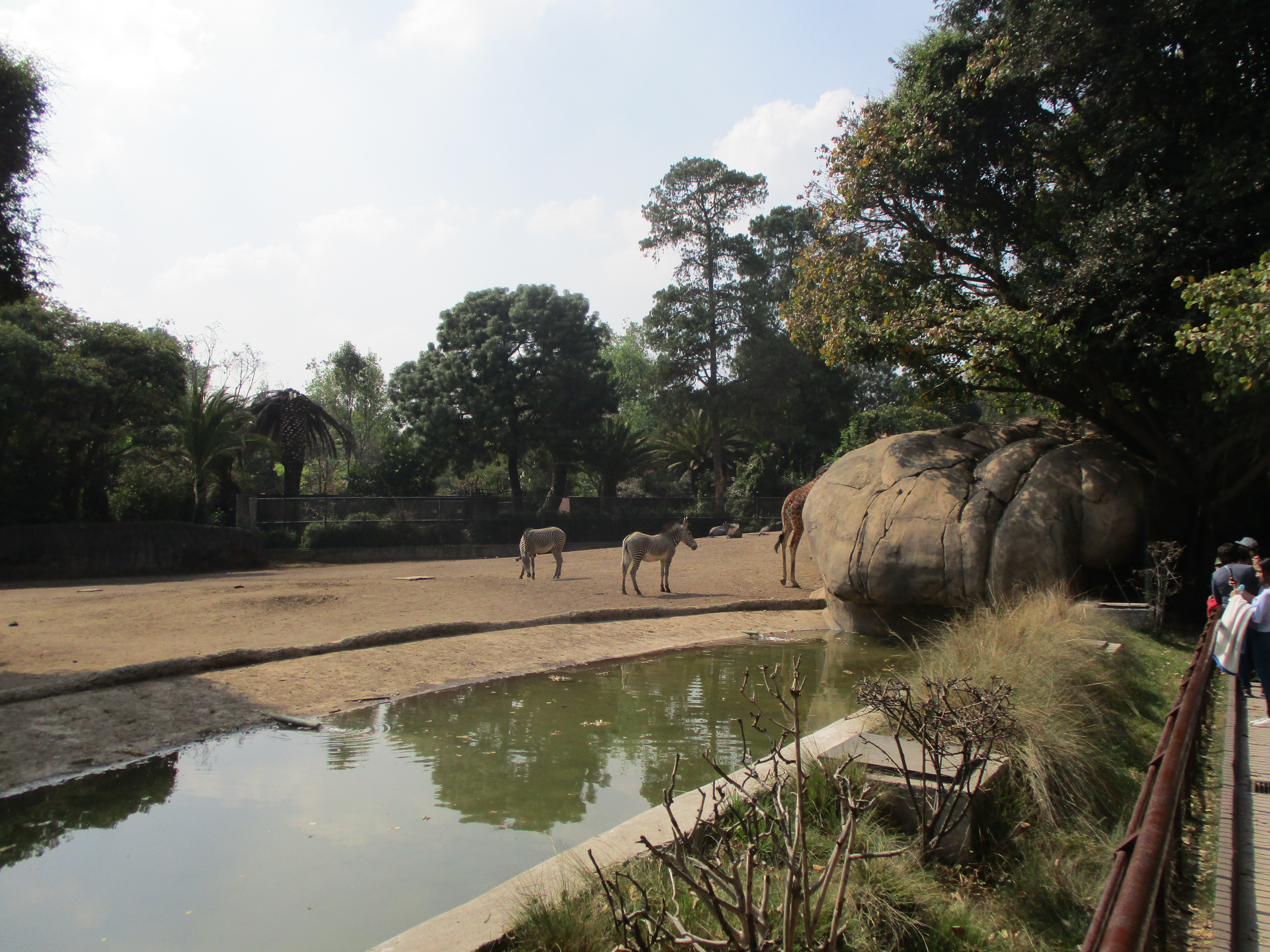

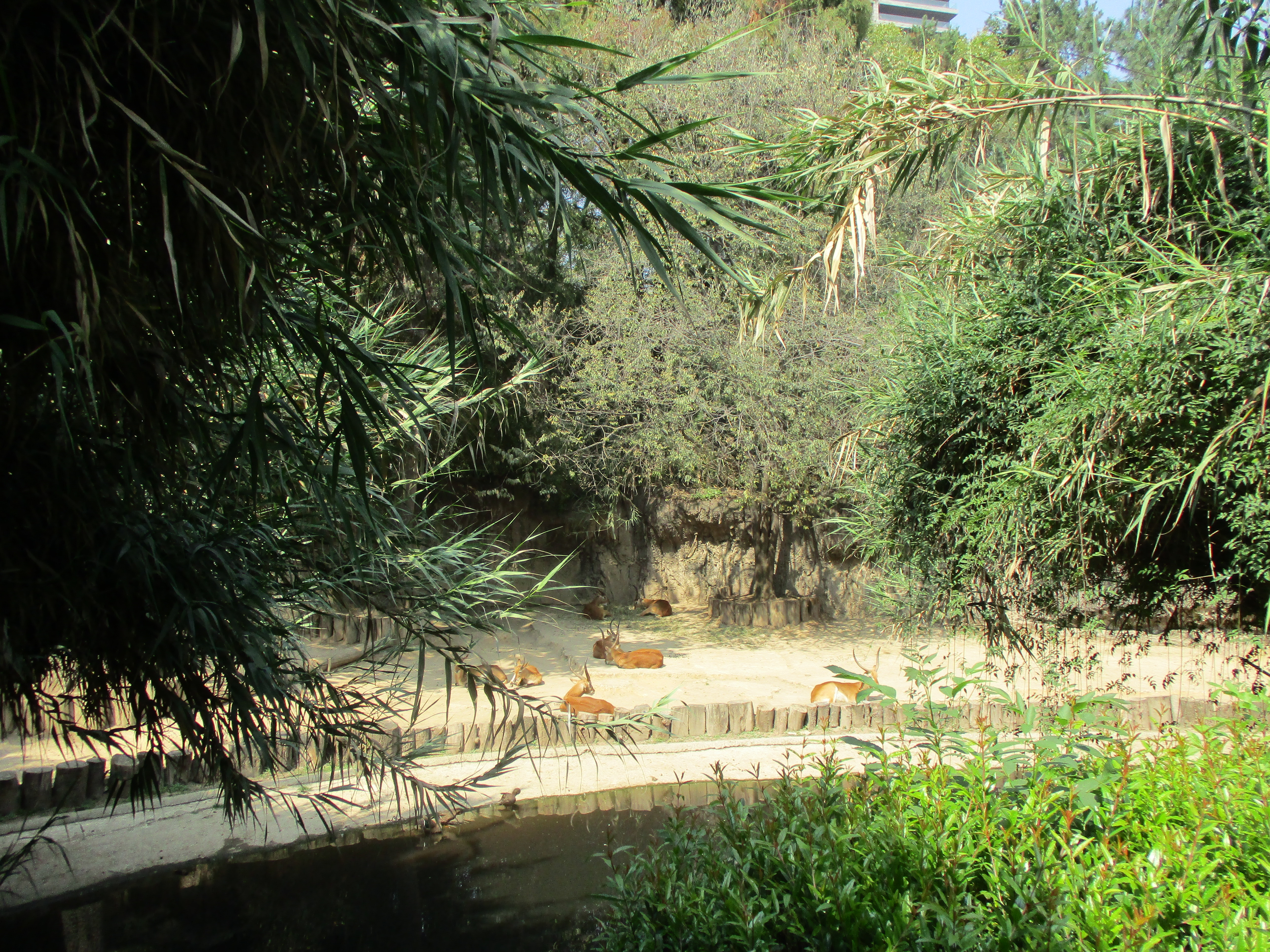

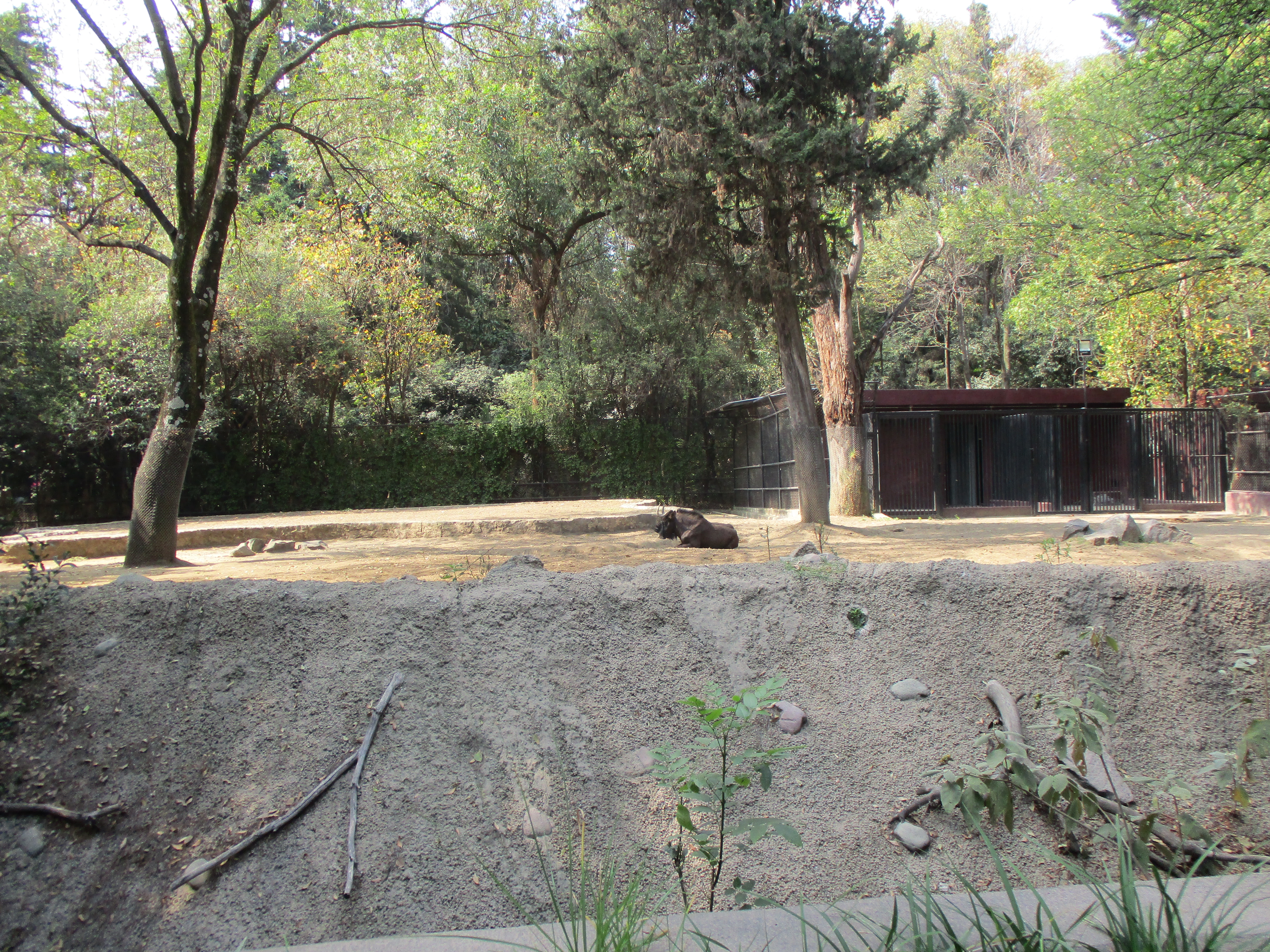

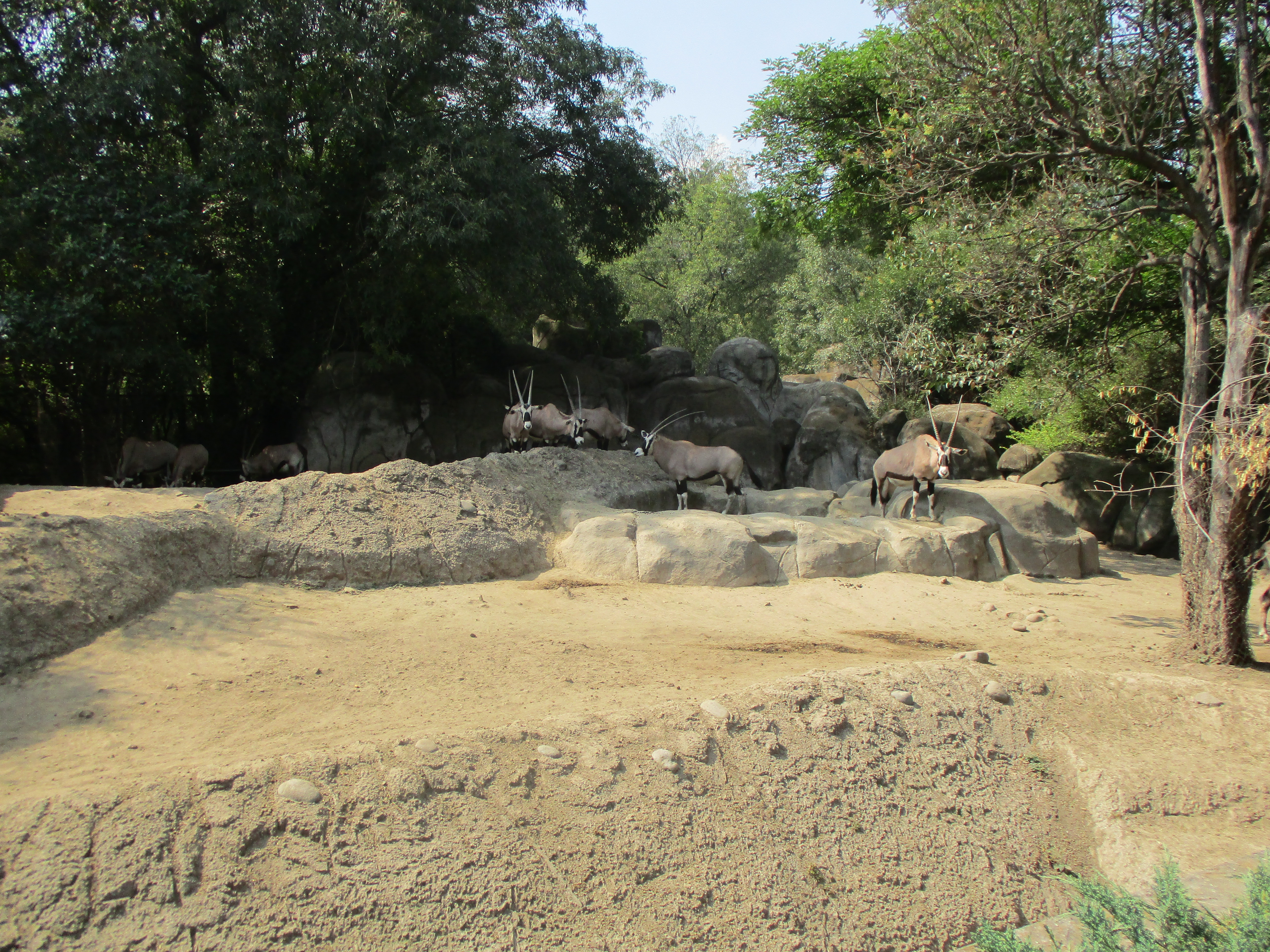

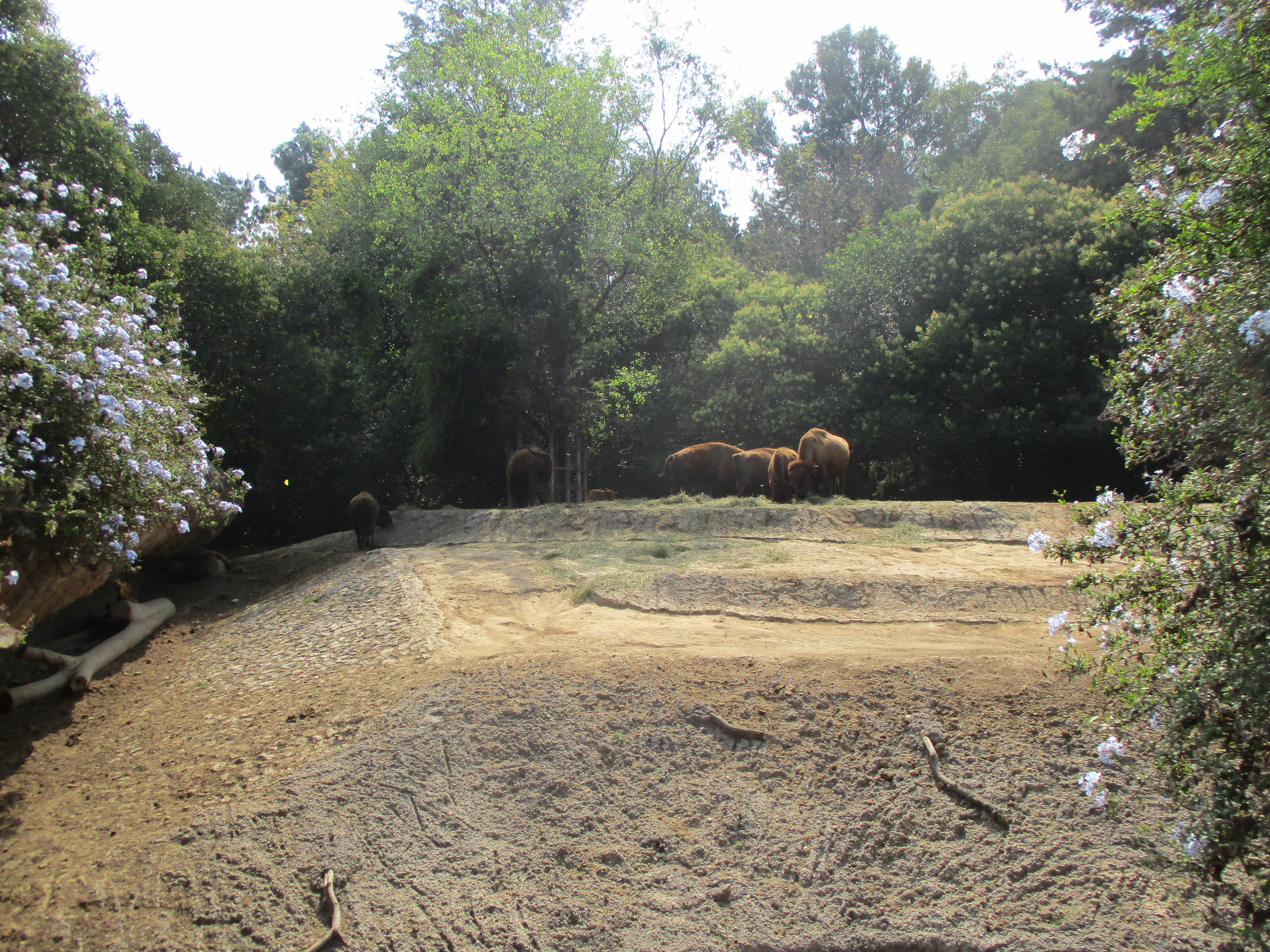

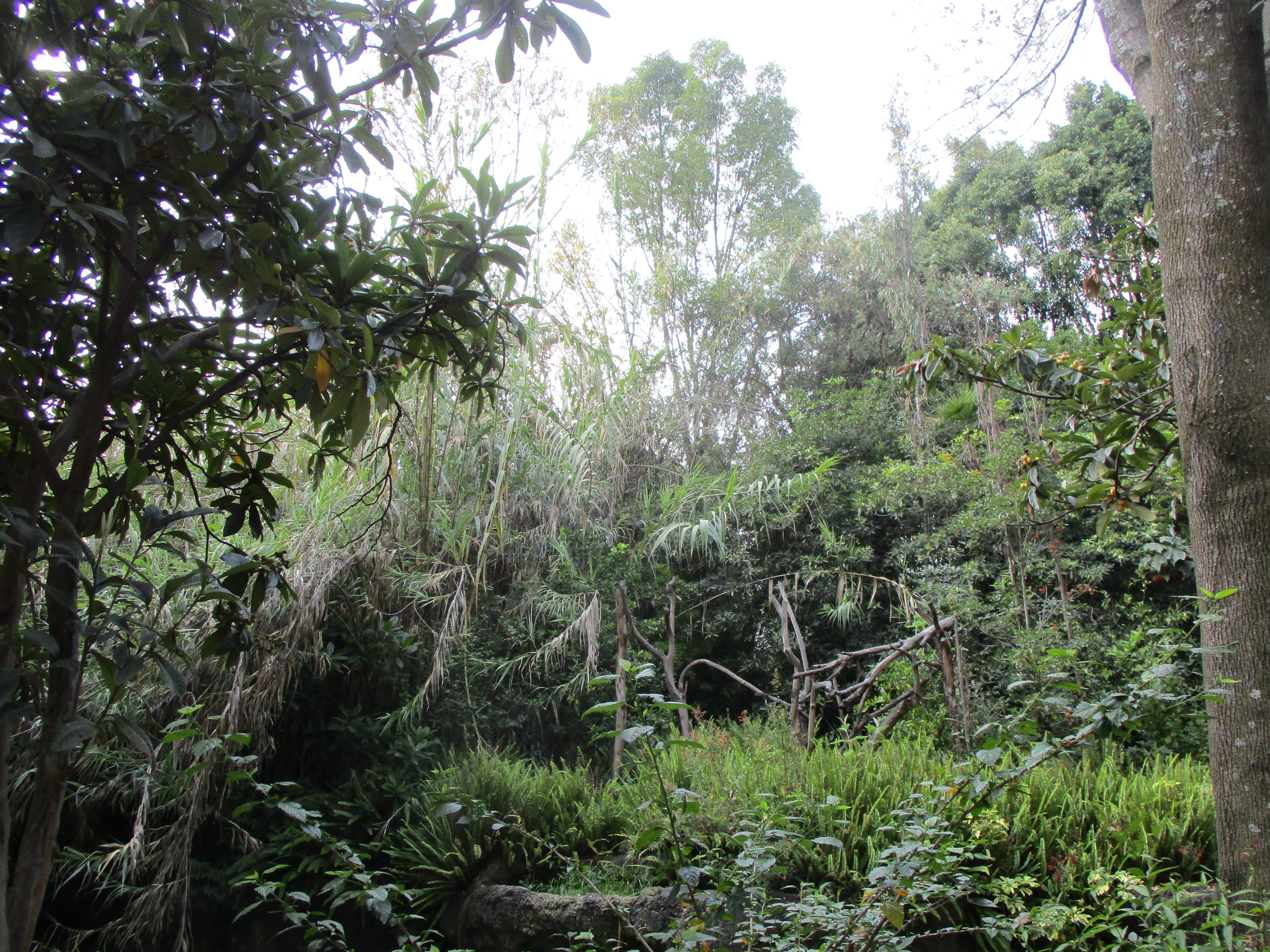

== Notes ==
- National Advice of Fauna "Consejo Nacional de Fauna" - (in Spanish)
- Article on the zoo at "Giant Panda Planet.com"
- Review of the zoo at "Mexico Desconocido Online"
- at "The Good Zoo Guide Online"
