= One Lucky Elephant =

- Written by: Cristina Colissimo; Lisa Leeman
- Directed by: Lisa Leeman
- Starring: Ivor David Balding; Flora the Elephant; Laura Balding; Carol Buckley; Willie Theison
- Theme music composer: Miriam Cutler
- Country of origin: United States
- Original language: English

Production
- Executive producers: Lizzie Friedman; Greg Little
- Producers: Cristina Colissimo; Jordana Glick-Franzheim
- Cinematography: Sandra Chandler; Shana Hagen; Neil Brown; Cristina Colissimo
- Editors: Kate Amend; Tchavdar Georgiev
- Running time: 82 minutes

Original release
- Network: Oprah Winfrey Network
- Release: June 15, 2011

One Lucky Elephant is an American documentary film directed by Lisa Leeman that premiered December 1, 2011 on Oprah Winfrey Network as part of the OWN Documentary Club. The film focuses on the extraordinary human-animal bond between Circus Flora founder, Ivor David Balding, and Flora an endangered African elephant, and their journey to find her a permanent home that leads them to The Elephant Sanctuary (Hohenwald). The film provides insightful research footage to further discussion of the human-animal bond as part of anthrozoology (human–animal studies), a new academic field that examines the relationships between non-human and human animals.

== Synopsis ==
Where does an elephant go after a life in the circus? Sixteen years have passed since circus producer Ivor David Balding adopted Flora, the orphaned baby African elephant he lovingly raised as part of his family and made the star of his show. As Flora approaches adulthood, he realizes that she is not happy performing. Ultimately, David must face the difficult truth that the circus is no place for Flora. She needs to be with other elephants. The road to Flora's retirement, however, is a difficult and emotional journey which tests their bond in unexpected ways. Ten years in the making, One Lucky Elephant explores the consequences of keeping wild animals in captivity, while never losing sight of the delicate love story at its heart.

== Cast ==
- Ivor David Balding as himself
- Flora the African Elephant as herself
- Laura Balding as herself
- Carol Buckley as herself
- Willie Theison as himself

== Production ==
One Lucky Elephant was directed and co-written by Lisa Leeman and produced and co-written by Cristina Colissimo and produced by Jordana Glick-Franzheim. The film was shot over ten years on location in St. Louis, Missouri, Zoo Miami in Florida, Pittsburgh Zoo & PPG Aquarium in Pennsylvania and at The Elephant Sanctuary in Tennessee. According to the director, the introduction to the characters came from, "Miriam Cutler, a composer who specializes in docs and who co-produced and scored this film, has been the resident composer for Circus Flora since its early days. Miriam was fascinated watching Flora grow up in the circus, and when she heard that David Balding wanted to retire Flora -- his 18-year-old African elephant, the star of his circus and sort of his surrogate daughter – – and send her back to Africa, she thought it would make a terrific film, and started calling documentary directors she knew."

The filmmakers originally set out to tell the story of Flora's journey back to Africa, but when that plan took a detour that put the production of this film in financial jeopardy, the producers, "kept on filming for nearly 8 years. We had arranged for Flora to temporarily live with the small herd of African elephants at Zoo Miami, the zoo my father had founded. Flora's financial needs quickly began to outweigh that of the film, so we founded a non-profit, Ahali Elephants, and began fundraising for her future..."

== Release and reception ==
One Lucky Elephant premiered at the 2010 LA Film Festival and was released theatrically in New York City at Film Forum on June 8, 2011, and in Los Angeles at Laemmle Theatres in Los Angeles.

"The premiere, sponsored by Humane Society of the United States, drew comedienne and elephant advocate Lily Tomlin, Academy Award® winning-director Kathryn Bigelow, actress Charlotte Ross, actor/filmmaker Dominic Scott Kay and actress/singer Persia White. Following the film, the audience was treated to a panel discussion that focused on the plight of elephants and other wild animals in captivity and the many issues sparked by the film. The impressive panel featured the film’s director Lisa Leeman, its writer/producer Cristina Colissimo, Laura Balding (the wife of Flora's 'father', David Balding, featured in the film), scientist Dr. Toni Frohoff (behavioral and wildlife biologist and author of "Dolphin Mysteries: Unlocking the Secrets of Communication"), Dr. Lorin Lindner (clinical psychologist and author of "Post-Traumatic Stress and Elephants in Captivity"), and Ron Kagan (director, Detroit Zoo, one of the first zoos to close their elephant exhibit, relocating their elephants to sanctuaries). NY Times journalist and author Charles Siebert, moderated".

Manohla Dargis of The New York Times called the film, "Sweet, heart-and-trunk-tugging". In the Chicago Sun-Times Roger Ebert describes "One Lucky Elephant as, "simple enough to delight a child and complex enough to baffle a philosopher", then poignantly and perceptively notes, "A larger question coils beneath the surface of the film. What happens to an elephant that is "trained"? Are the chains, ropes, prods and other training tools kind to the creature? Should any wild animal be trained in such a way?"

Sherri Linden of the Hollywood reporter said, "Bottom Line: A timely, emotionally engaging look at interspecies bonds"; while John Anderson of Variety call the film, "A parable of pachydermish proportions, "One Lucky Elephant" is a bittersweet story of man, beast and a very real relationship that makes helmer Lisa Leeman's docu the thinking person's "Dumbo"...

The film has been critically praised by reviewers and maintains a 96% rating on Rotten Tomatoes.

Awards

One Lucky Elephant was awarded the 2010 Woodstock Film Festival James Lyons Award for Best Editing of a Feature Documentary, Kate Amend and Tchavdar Gerogiev, Editors.

2010 recipient of The Humane Society of the United States ACE Grant for Animal Content in Entertainment.

One Lucky Elephant was selected to participate in the 2011 American Film Program, a program for cultural exchange of the United States State Department's Bureau of Educational and Cultural Affairs. According to a New York Times article, the Documentary Showcase is, "Conducting Documentary Diplomacy."

== See also ==
- Project Nim
- Buck
