= Elephant sanctuary =

Elephant sanctuary may refer to:

- A wildlife refuge for elephants
- Elephant Nature Park, Chiang Mai, Thailand
- Mwaluganje Elephant Sanctuary, Kenya
- Pinnawala Elephant Orphanage, Sri Lanka
- Sheldrick Wildlife Trust, Kenya
- The Elephant Sanctuary, Tennessee, United States
- The Elephant Sanctuary Hartbeespoort Dam, South Africa
