= Hanako (elephant) =

Asian elephant (1947–2016)

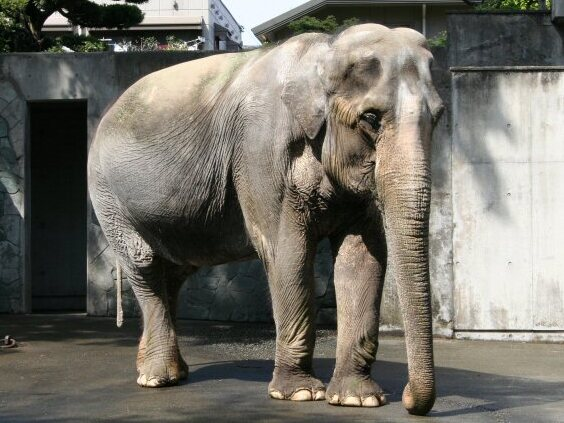
- Hanako in 2006
- Species: Elephas maximus
- Sex: Female
- Born: 1947; Thailand
- Died: May 26, 2016 (aged 68–69); Inokashira Park Zoo, Musashino, Tokyo, Japan

Hanako (Japanese: はな子; 1947 – May 26, 2016) was a female Asian elephant who lived in Japan. Born in Thailand, she was brought to the Ueno Zoo as a young elephant, the first elephant to be imported into the country after World War II. She was joined shortly after by Indira, an elephant from India, but the two were separated after a few years when Indira was sent on a tour of Japan and Hanako sent to Inokashira Park Zoo in Musashino, Tokyo.

In 1956, a few years after her arrival in Inokashira, Hanako killed a drunken man who had entered her habitat at night. Two years later, she accidentally killed one of her keepers. These incidents led to negative attention towards Hanako. Zoo visitors dubbed her a "killer elephant" and threw rocks at her, leading Hanako to experience physical and mental health issues. Inokashira Park Zoo brought in a handler, Yamakawa Seizō, to care for her. Yamakawa spent six years nursing Hanako back to health and then continued to work as her keeper until his retirement in 1991. Their story was made into a book.

In 2015, a Canadian animal rights activist wrote a blog post about Hanako's living conditions at the zoo. Hanako lived in a concrete enclosure and she lacked access to greenery or other elephants. Over 400,000 people signed a petition asking Inokashira Park Zoo to agree to move Hanako to an elephant sanctuary in Thailand. After consultations with elephant experts, the activists, and the zoo, this was determined to be an unhelpful solution. Due to Hanako's advanced age, it was unlikely that she could be safely moved or that she would enjoy the company of other elephants. Inokashira Park Zoo agreed to make improvements to Hanako's habitat and give her more toys.

Hanako died in 2016, at the age of sixty-nine. At the time of her death, she was the oldest elephant in Japan. Over a thousand people attended a memorial ceremony for her at the zoo, and in 2017 the city of Musashino erected a statue in her honour.

== Life ==
=== Arrival in Japan and Ueno Zoo ===
In the aftermath of World War II and the starvation of Ueno Zoo's previous elephants, Shoichi Noma, the president of Japanese publishing company Kodansha, arranged with the Thai businessman Somwang Sarasas and Thai prime minister Plaek Phibunsongkhram to export an elephant from Thailand. Sarasas selected his elephant Gajah, also called Gachako, a young calf who had been born in 1947 in Thailand. He and Phibunsongkhram donated her to Japan on behalf of the Boy Scouts of Thailand. Meanwhile, the Ueno Zoo made arrangements with the Supreme Commander for the Allied Powers to allow elephants to be taken into the country.

External image
- Hanako arriving at Kobe Port in 1949

Gajah, then two years old, arrived at the Port of Kobe on September 2, 1949. Japan National Railways organized a train to take her from the port to her new home at Ueno Zoo. During stops, Gajah was forced to exit the train and greet crowds of children. Her keeper had originally planned for a truck to transport her from Shimbashi Station to Ueno Zoo, but, due to the crowds, he was forced to walk with her for the final part of their journey through Tokyo. She arrived at the zoo on September 4. On September 10, as part of a contest for Japanese schoolchildren, Gajah was renamed Hanako, after a former elephant at Ueno Zoo who had been killed during World War II.

Hanako was the first elephant imported into post-war Japan. There were only two other elephants in the country on the date of her arrival, both from the Higashiyama Zoological Gardens. A few weeks after Hanako's arrival, she was joined by the older Indira. Indira was gifted to Japan by Indian prime minister Jawaharlal Nehru, and she, at first, "eclipsed" Hanako's arrival. Once both elephants were on display, ten thousand people came to the zoo to see them. In April 1950, due to the pair's popularity, Japanese newspaper The Asahi Shimbun and the city of Tokyo sponsored a tour across the country for Indira, which concluded in September 1950. The proceeds where used to purchase another elephant, Jumbo, to live with Hanako and Indira, though this had the side effect of crowding all three elephants. Hanako would also go on tour herself, though as part of a smaller mobile zoo that visited only the Tokyo area and Izu Ōshima. After a six-week stay at Inokashira Park Zoo, in Musashino, Tokyo, local children's welfare activists requested that she be sent there permanently for the local children.

=== Transfer to Inokashira Park Zoo and killings ===
External image
- Hanako being transferred to Inokashira Park Zoo

In March 1954, Hanako was moved to live by herself at Inokashira Park Zoo. When a drunk man with a history of harassing zoo animals entered the elephant habitat one night in 1956, Hanako killed him. His naked corpse was discovered the next day by zookeepers, leading them to believe that Hanako had removed his clothing. Four years later, in April 1960, Hanako's keeper, 53 year old Masaki Saito, was caught in her chains and she accidentally trampled him to death. Due to the two deaths, public sentiment turned against Hanako. Zoo visitors threw rocks at her, called her a "killer elephant", and some demanded she be euthanized. Hanako became anxious, depressed, and stopped eating or making public appearances. She was locked away in chains; her upper teeth fell out and she started to suffer from malnutrition.

To care for Hanako, the Inokashira Park Zoo brought in a keeper, Seizō Yamakawa, from the Tama Zoological Park. Yamakawa spent six years coaxing Hanako and feeding her potatoes and carrots to help her regain her strength. Yamakawa continued to work as Hanako's keeper until his retirement in 1991, after which he refused to see her in order so that she could get used to her new keepers. In 2006, Yamakawa's son, Koji Yamakawa, wrote a book about his father and Hanako called Hanako, the elephant my father loved (Japanese: 父が愛したゾウのはな子). Her life was also the basis for a 2007 television special Hanako the Elephant (Japanese: ゾウのはな子) and a children's book called Hanako the Elephant: That's why she's here (Japanese: ゾウのはな子 ~だからココにいるんだよ) was written about her.

=== Final years and petition ===
In the late 2000s and early 2010s, a series of accidents relating to Hanako and her keepers caused the zoo to switch to a more hands-off style of elephant keeping. Several keepers had been knocked over by Hanako, and the zoo was concerned for their safety. The zoo also announced plans for her sleeping quarters to be refurbished.

Every March, to celebrate Hanako's birthday, the Thai embassy in Japan bought her strawberries. In 2015, Japanese organizations donated a portrait of Hanako by Musashino artist Aki Fueda to the Thai embassy in commemoration of the 2015 Bangkok bombing.

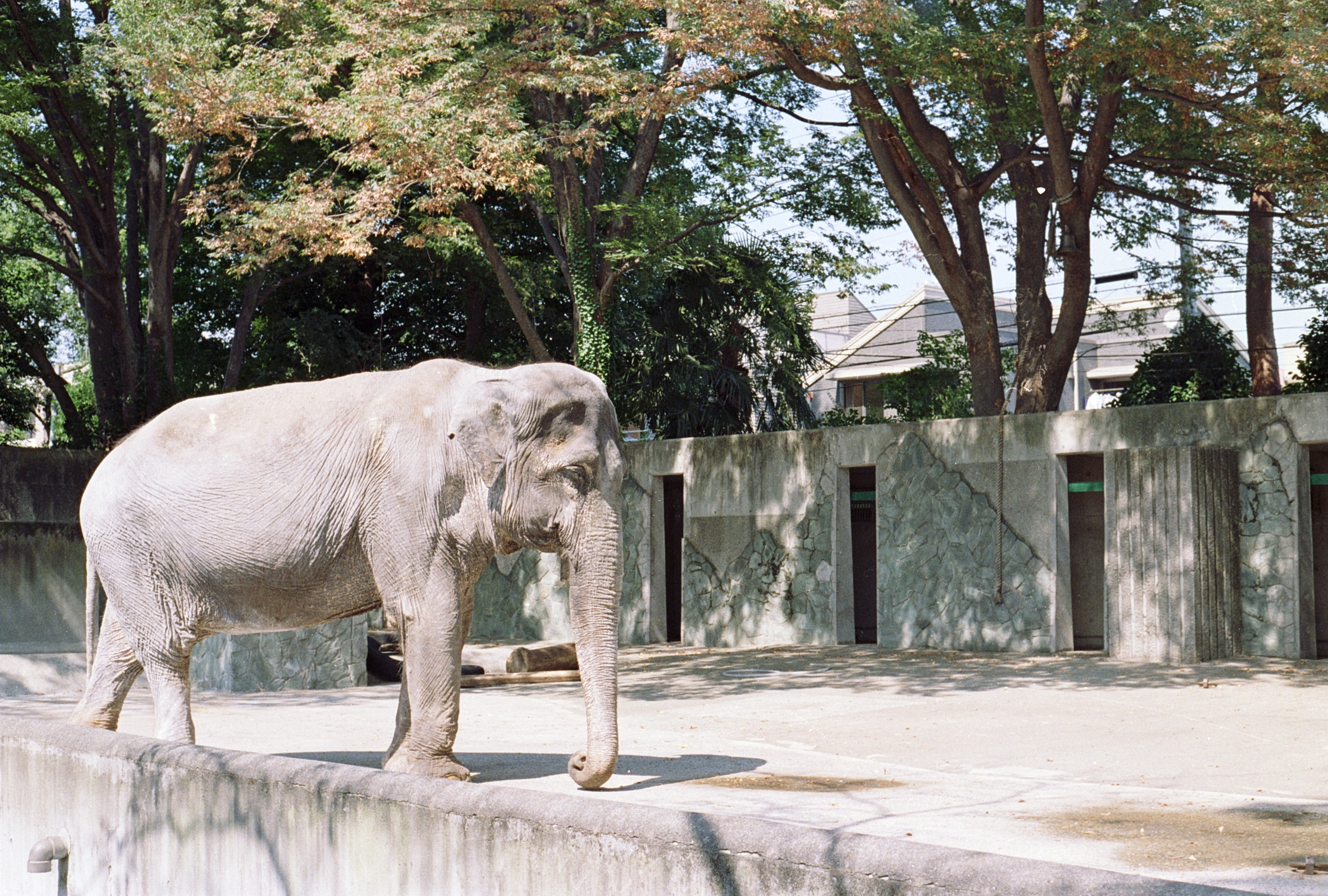
Hanako in her enclosure in 2014

In 2015, Canadian animal rights activist Ulara Nakagawa wrote a blog post condemning Hanako's living conditions and calling the elephant habitat at Inokashira a "concrete prison". Hanako's enclosure, which she had lived in by herself ever since her arrival at Inokashira, lacked greenery and was made of concrete in a style similar to many other Japanese animal enclosures. Hanako only had access to a small pool and a sheltered room. In response to Nakagawa's post, Hanako was nicknamed the "loneliest elephant in the world" and members of the public started a petition encouraging the zoo to improve her living situation and send her to live in a sanctuary in her native Thailand. The director of the zoo initially called the petition "self-righteous and bigoted". Nearly 470,000 people signed, and 30,000USD was raised to pay for an elephant expert, Carol Buckley, to visit her. Due to the elephant's age, Buckley, Nakagawa, and the zoo agreed that Hanako could not be safely moved from the zoo, and that after spending so long in isolation, the presence of other elephants would stress her. They also believed that expanding her enclosure or adding plants might frighten or confuse her, but that adding heaters and mats could improve her living situation. Inokashira Park Zoo did agree to make certain changes to Hanako's living spaces, such as by giving her more toys to play with. They also changed the fences around her enclosure, but Hanako appeared to become distressed by the fences and refused to leave her barn. According to a zoo official, once Hanako died, they would not get another elephant.

== Personality and health ==
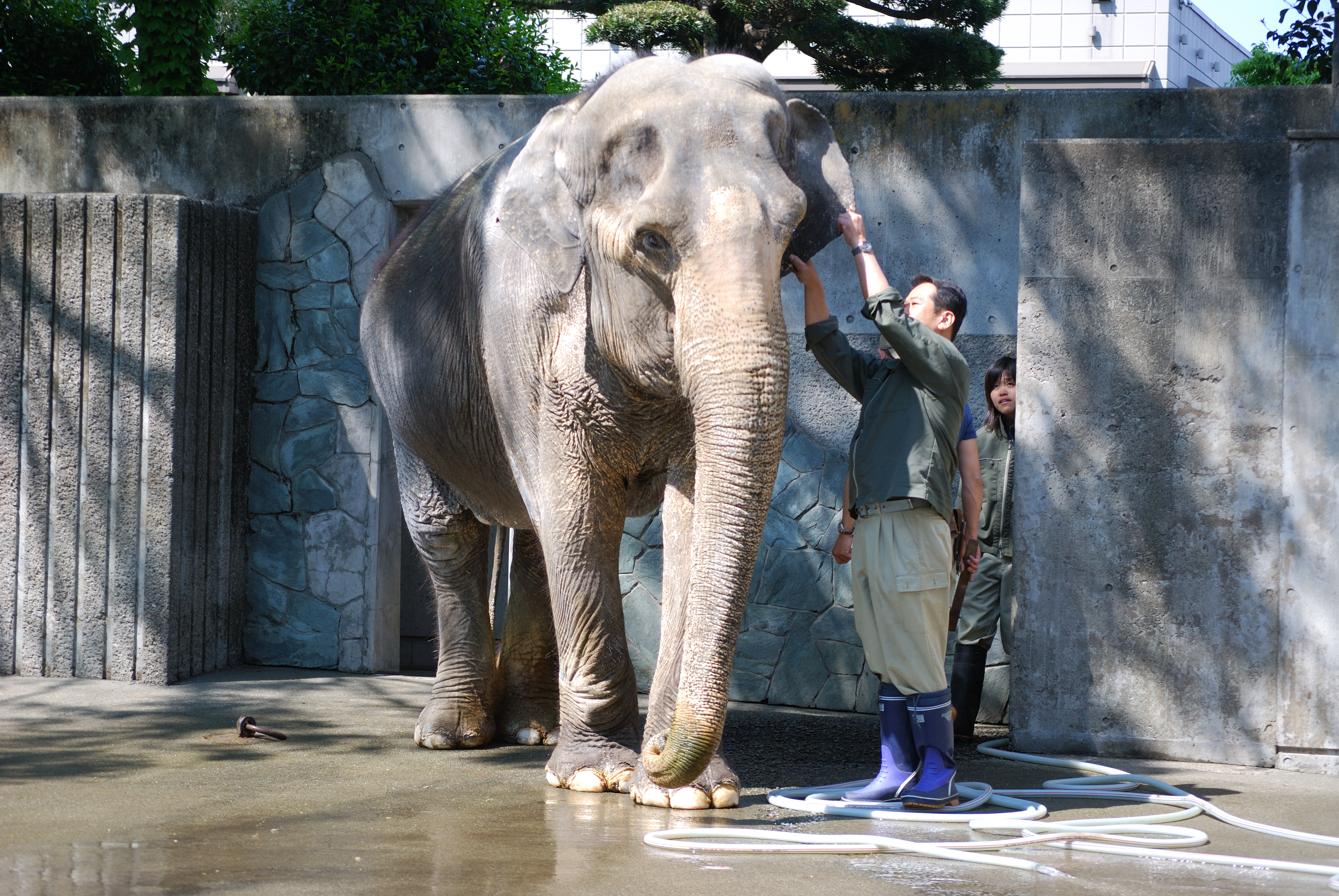
Hanako and her keepers in 2009

According to one of Hanako's keepers, Kanai Kinsaku, Hanako was sensitive to human moods. According to Kanai, she refused to listen to him when he had recently argued with his wife and so he "had to maintain a calm state of mind in order to handle Hanako. By so doing, Hanako saved [his] marriage". According to other keepers, Hanako was fond of people, and enjoyed being hand-fed, brushed, and having her feet cleaned. She made happy noises when her caretakers entered her enclosure and enjoyed playing with tires and a tube. In the final years of her life, Hanako only had one tooth and her caregivers fed her rice balls, fruit, and peeled bananas. They also noted that she had become fussy, more sensitive to change, she had not been eating as much, and had been losing strength. It was posthumously confirmed that she had developed arthritis in her right leg.

== Death and legacy ==
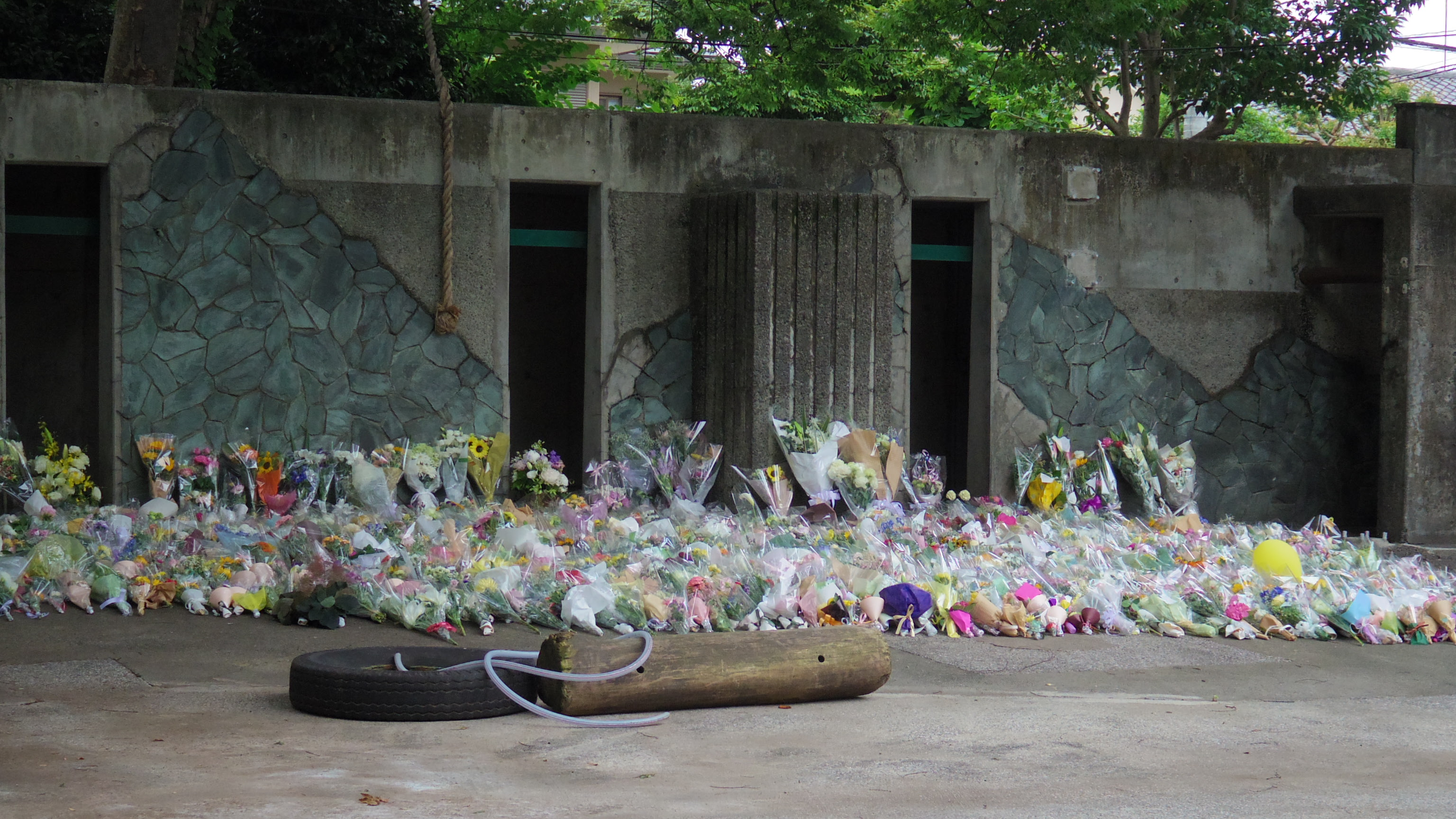
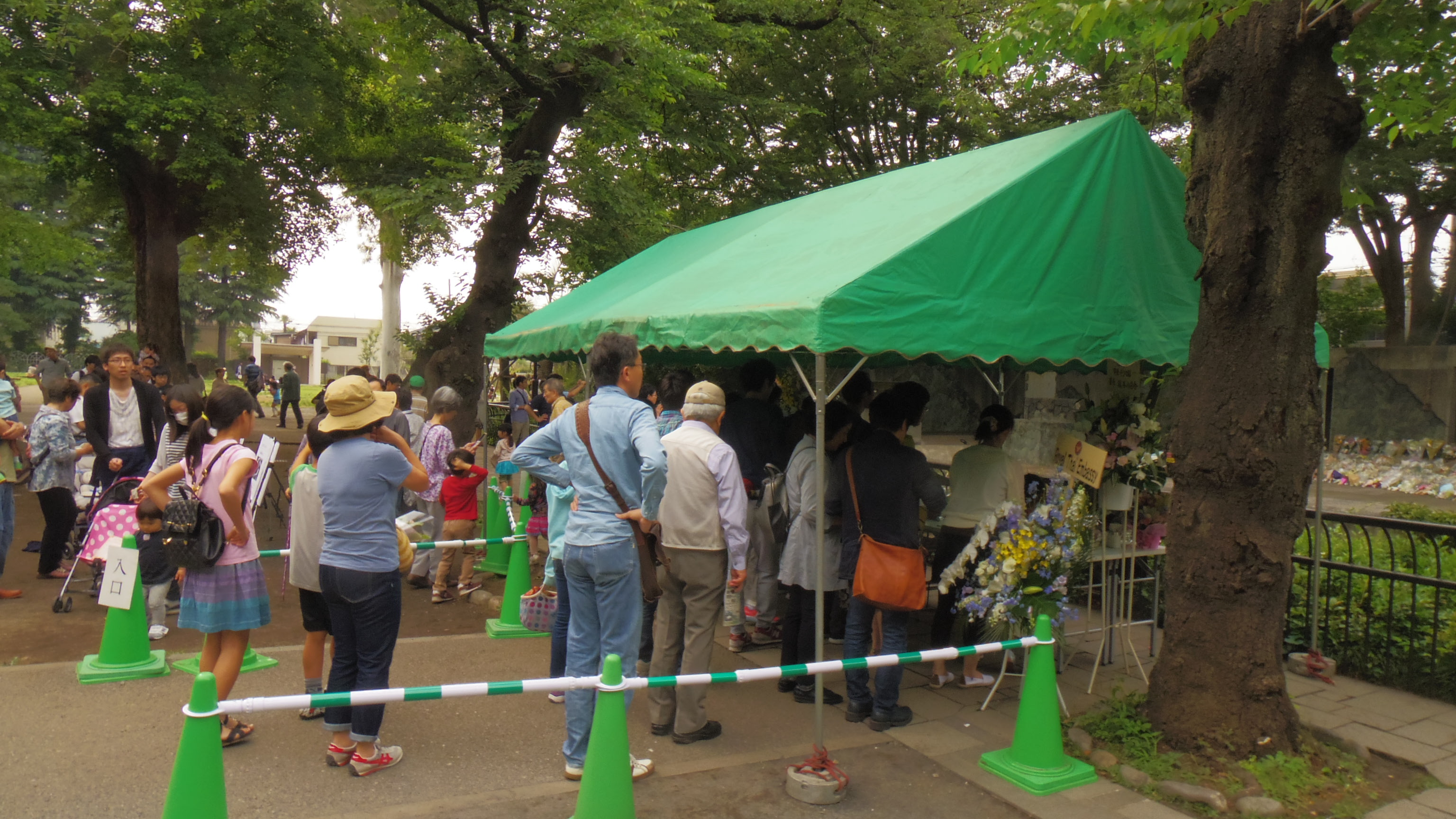
Memorials to Hanako at the Inokashira Park Zoo

On May 26, 2016, zookeepers discovered Hanako lying on the floor of her enclosure. They attempted to lift her upright to prevent her weight from causing internal injuries. She died later that afternoon, at the age of sixty-nine. According to an autopsy, she had died from respiratory failure, likely as a result of compression on her lungs. Her remains were donated to the National Museum of Nature and Science. At the time of her death, she was the oldest elephant in Japan until Anura tied with her in 2022. The previous oldest elephant, Umeko, had died at the age of sixty-five in 2009.

The governor of Tokyo, Yōichi Masuzoe, gave a statement after Hanako's death, saying that she "gave dreams and hopes to children" in post-World War II Japan. A memorial attended by 1,200 people, including the Thai ambassador to Japan, Musashino mayor Morimasa Murakami, and Mitaka city mayor Keiko Kiyohara, was held outside Hanako's habitat. 2,800 people laid flowers for her. Inokashira Park Zoo turned her habitat into a permanent exhibit on her life and, as of 2023, every year on the anniversary of her death they receive letters about Hanako from zoo visitors.

In 2017, a year after her death, Musashino city also started offering license plates for motorcycles shaped like Hanako. That same year, a statue of Hanako was erected by the north exit of Kichijōji Station. It was paid for by donations and designed by local artist Aki Fueda. The donations had been solicited by the city of Musashino, through the use of donation boxes at public facilities. In 2018, the city dressed Hanako's statue with a woven scarf in honour of the local mid-winter lights festivals, a practise which continued through at least 2020.

After Hanako's death, Ulara Nakagawa started an organization called Elephants in Japan that was designed to research, raise awareness of, and advocate better conditions for other solitary elephants in Japan.

== See also ==
- List of individual elephants
- Ziggy, an elephant in the United States kept confined for nearly thirty years
