= Elephant Nature Park =

Sanctuary in Chiang Mai, Thailand

- Interactive map of Elephant Nature Park
- 19°12′54″N 98°51′38″E
- Date opened: 1998
- Location: Chiang Mai, Thailand
- Land area: 250 acres (100 ha)
- Website: elephantnaturepark.org

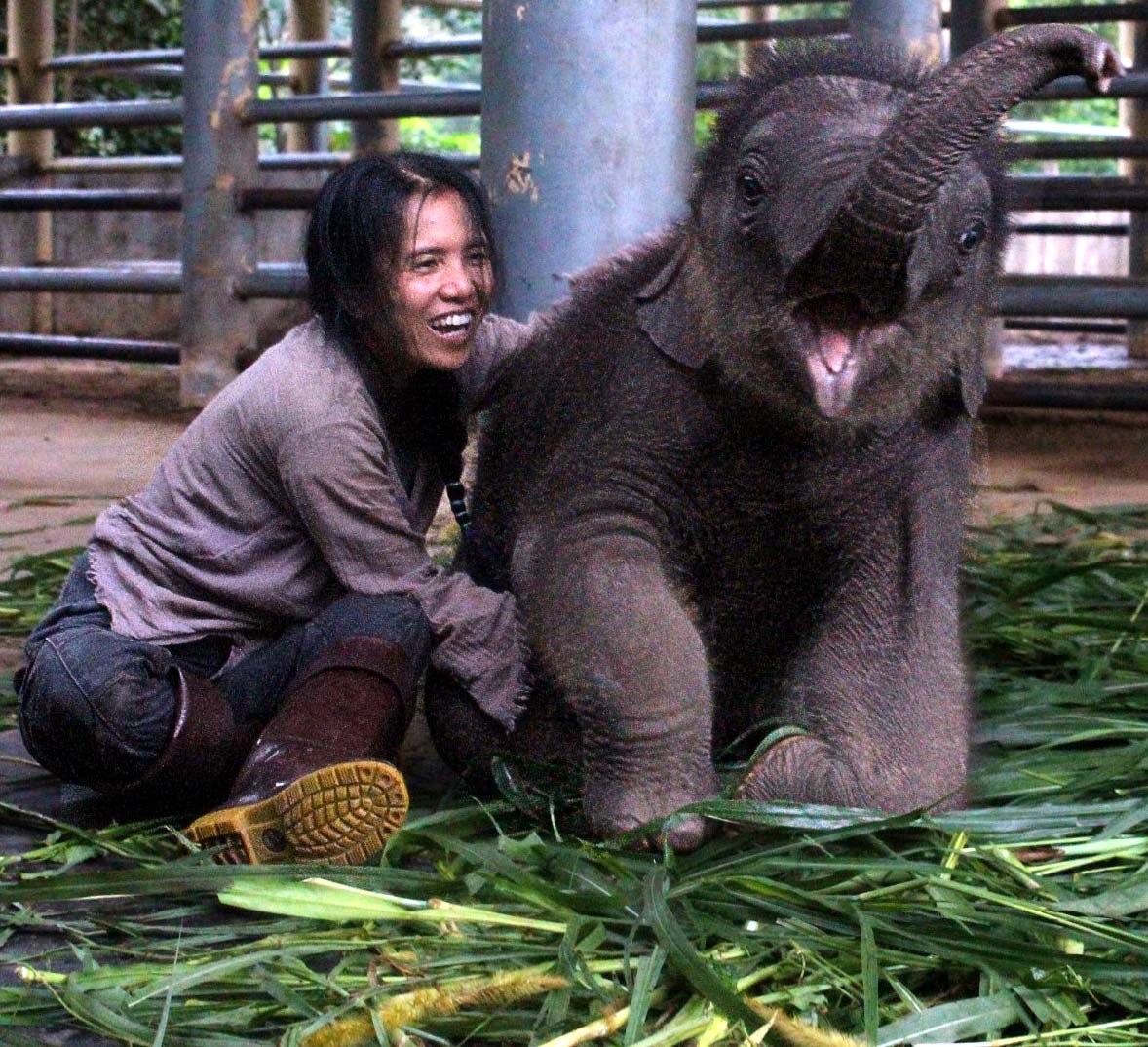
Navaan, born at the park in October 2012, with founder Lek Chailert.

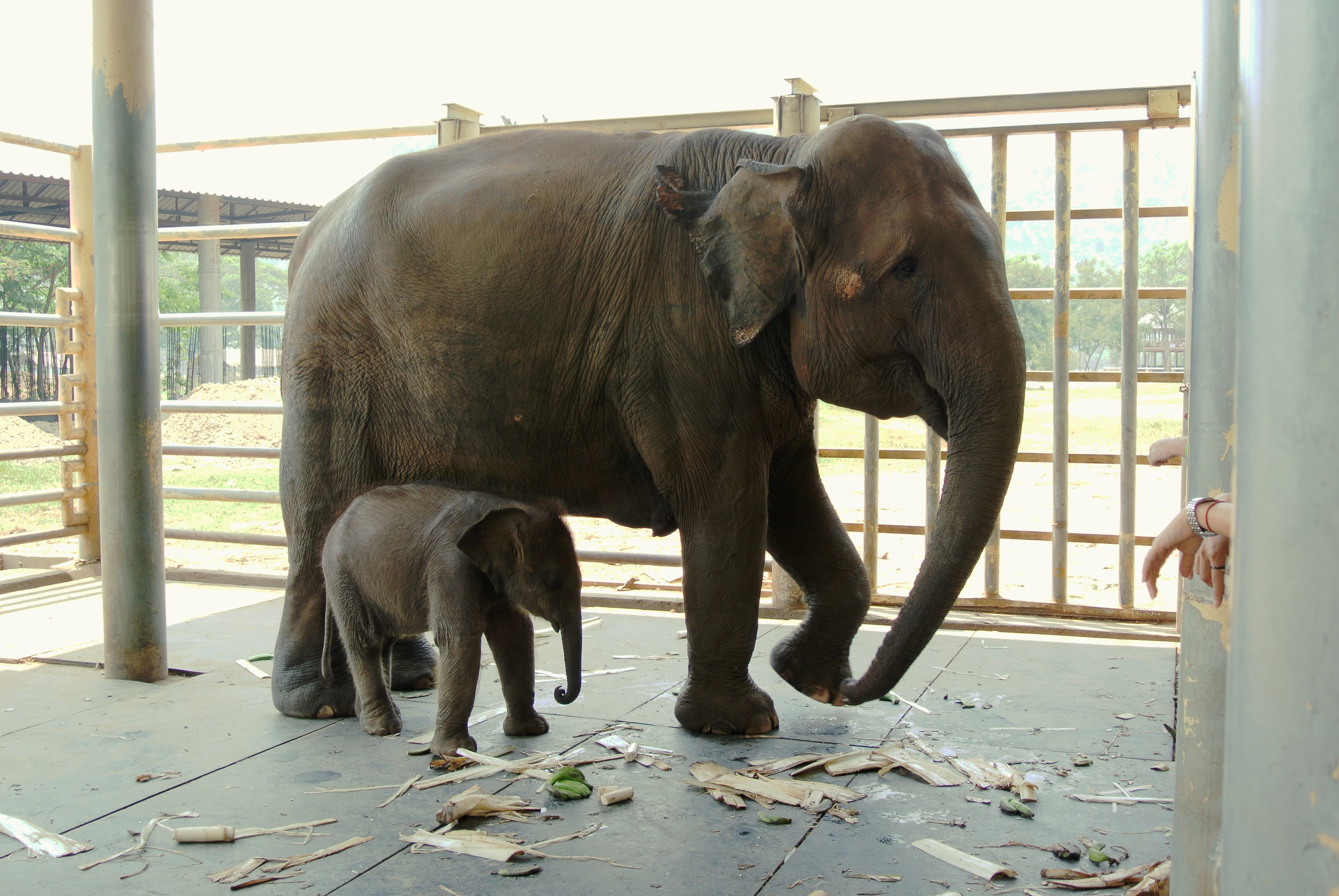
Female elephant (Dok Ngern, 15 years, with newly born Dok Mai) (23 days).

Elephant Nature Park is a sanctuary and rescue centre for elephants in Mae Taeng District, Chiang Mai province, northern Thailand, approximately 60 kilometres (37 mi) from Chiang Mai city, co-founded by Sangduen "Lek" Chailert. In 2013, Erawan Elephant Retirement Park opened in western Thailand as an offshoot. By 2016, there were branch parks in Surin and in Cambodia, and there were plans to open a fifth park in Phuket. By then, the work was coordinated by the Save Elephant Foundation.

The parks provide sanctuary for rescued elephants and operate under a business model in which tourists pay to visit and help care for the animals, and they can stay for extended periods. In addition to its elephant rescue work, the sanctuary has expanded its focus to include rehabilitation and care for other rescued animals such as dogs and water buffalo, reflecting its broader mission of compassionate wildlife protection.

== History ==
Lek Chailert started working on elephant conservation in 1996. Teak logging, in which many elephants were used, was banned in Thailand in 1989, and those elephants had been abandoned or sold for use in the tourist industry or for begging in cities. Elephants were also left maimed after poachers took their ivory tusks.

In the late 1990s, the government of Thailand worked to promote ecotourism in Chiang Mai Province. Tourism brought in 350 million dollars in 1997 and was the province's biggest source of revenue; the plans were controversial with the province's indigenous people however.

By 1998, an organization called Green Tours, run by Adam Flinn, had founded Elephant Nature Park, a tourist site and reserve for rescued elephants in a valley about an hour north of Chiang Mai city, together with Chailert, who owned some of the land and leased the rest from the Thai government. At that time, the park featured a daily show where elephants performed tricks like balancing on one leg and playing football, and included elephant rides. Chailert maintained a more isolated section on one of the surrounding mountains for especially damaged animals that she called "Elephant Heaven". At the time, the park had 34 rescued elephants. Chailert's goal was to eventually end the performances and run it purely as a reserve.

By 2002, Chailert was well known for campaigning against elephant crushing, and around that time, a documentary about the treatment of elephants in Thailand, which featured Chailert's work, was released. In response, PETA called for a boycott of the country until conditions changed.

Chailert was listed in a special 2005 post-tsunami issue of the Asian edition of Time magazine as one of "Asia's heroes". However, the boycott campaign made her an embarrassment to the Thai government and led to death threats. Friends of the Asian Elephant, a government-funded organization that had done work to improve conditions for elephants, ending its funding of her work.

By 2005, 17 of the elephants Chailert had rescued were adults, and she opened a travel agency in Chiang Mai. By this time, the park no longer offered performances and had shifted to a business model in which visitors could come help care for the elephants.

In 2010, the park housed 33 elephants, and visitors could stay for up to a month, paying $400/week.

In 2011, Elephant Nature Park received support from Elephant Aid International for mahout training as well as alleviating foot disease and stress levels among elephants and improving their diet, sanitation, and opportunities for exercise.

In 2013, Erawan Elephant Retirement Park opened in western Thailand on 50 hectares of land beside the River Kwai, an hour from Kanchanaburi, as an extension of the original park and using the same business model. It started out with five elephants, one of which died in the first year. In 2014, there were 37 elephants at Elephant Nature Park.

As of 2016, Chailert had rescued a total of 200 distressed elephants, and there were branch elephant parks in Surin and in Cambodia, as well as plans to open a fifth park in Phuket. That work is coordinated by the Save Elephant Foundation, run by the same people. Chailert has also been successful in convincing several independent camps to improve the lives of elephants and forbid tourists from riding them, through her Saddle Off! outreach program.

In addition to elephants, Elephant Nature Park houses dogs as well as cats, birds, and water buffaloes

=== 2024 floods ===
In September 2024, parts of East and Southeast Asia were hit by Typhoon Yagi. The tropical cyclone caused numerous deaths and significant destruction in Chiang Mai Province. Floodwaters reached Elephant Nature Park and forced the evacuation of residents and animals. On 8 October, two elephants were reported to have died.

=== 2026 ===
In June 2026, the park reported struggling with low levels of tourism.

== Recognition for Chailert ==
For her work, Chailert has received a number of awards, such as the Ford Foundation's Hero of the Planet (2001), Time magazine's Heroes of Asia (2005), a Women Heroes of Global Conservation (2010), and the Responsible Thailand Award for Animal Welfare (2018).

== Gallery ==
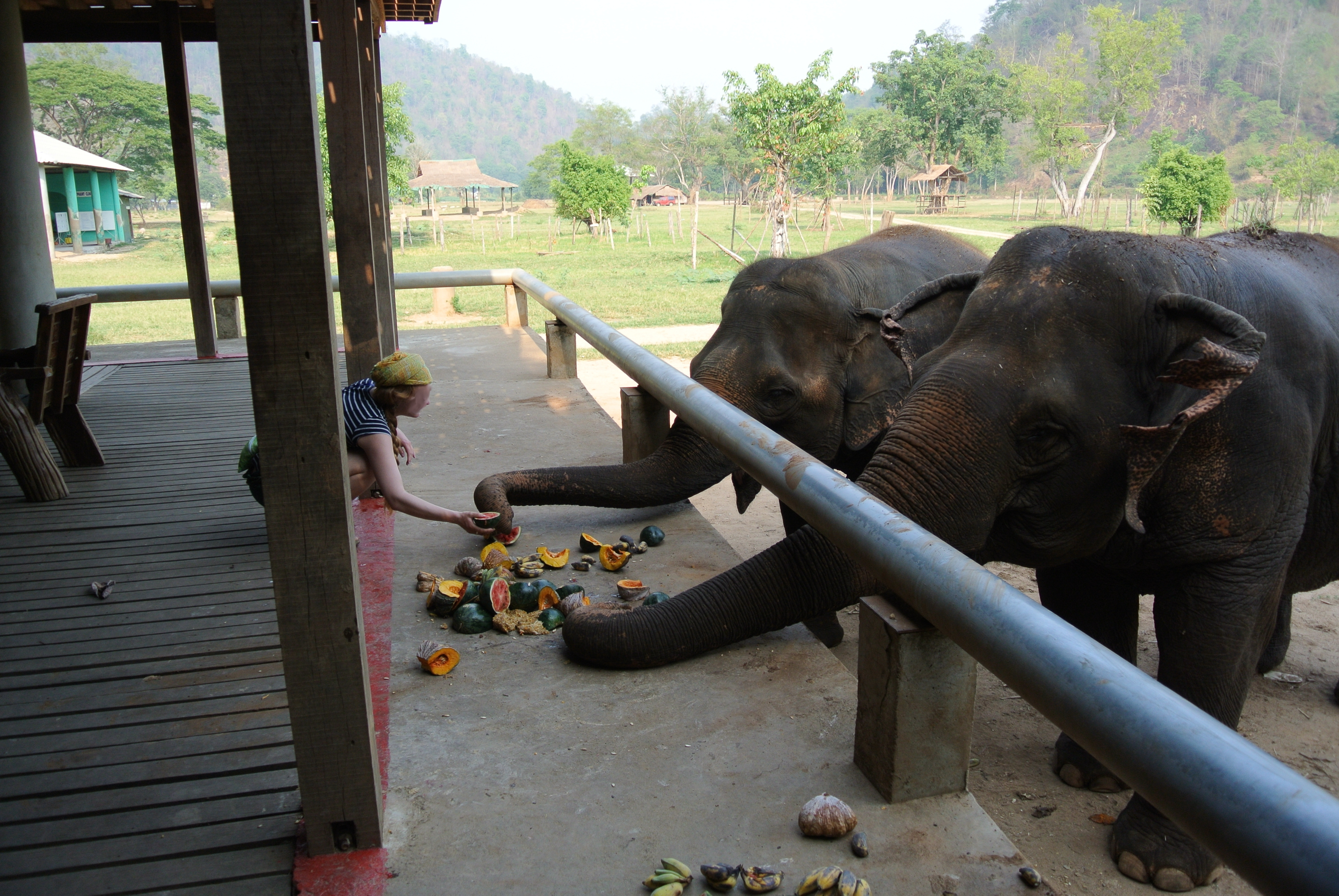
Feeding an elephant in a tailor-made shelter

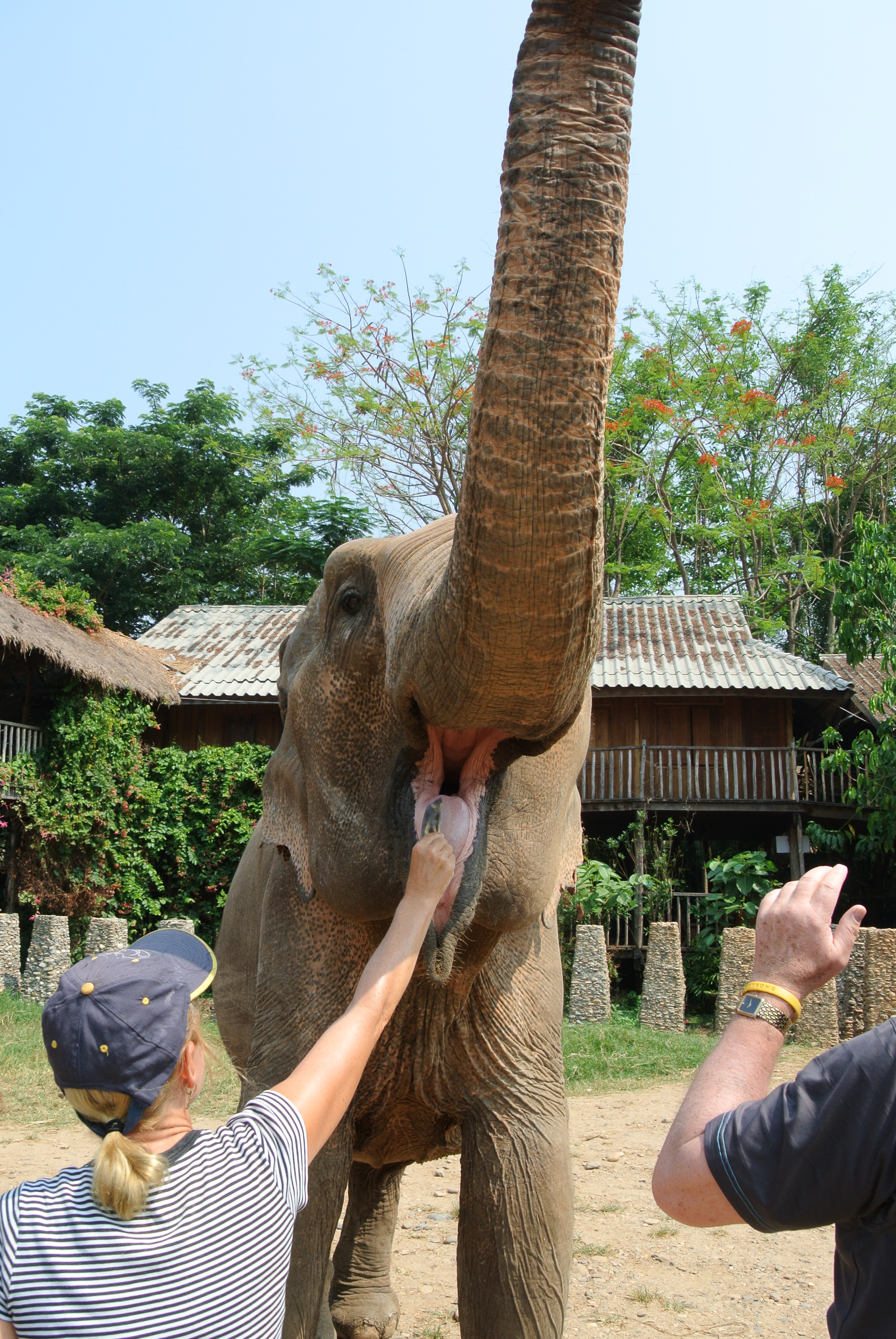
Feeding an elephant in the open

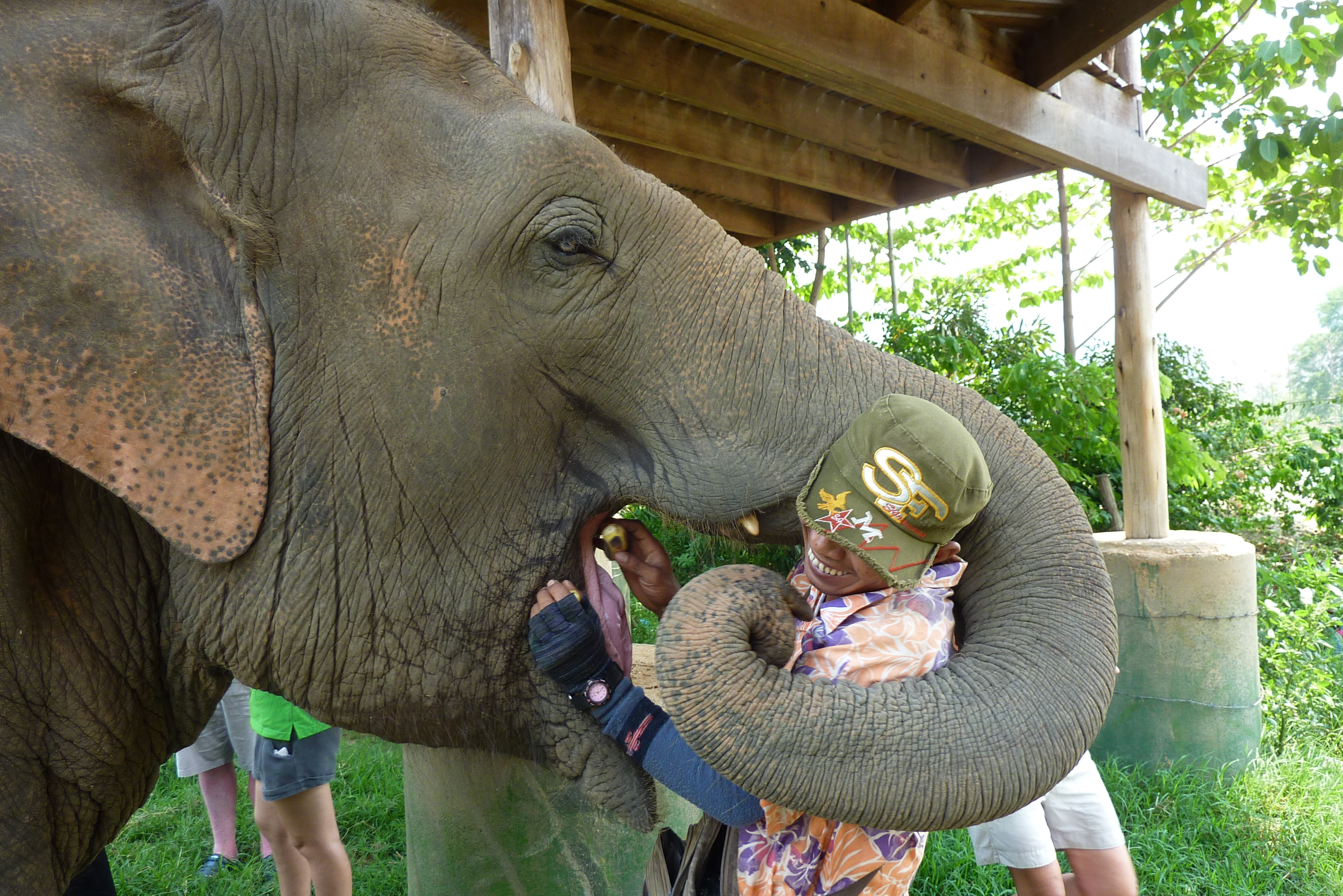
Mahout feeding an elephant

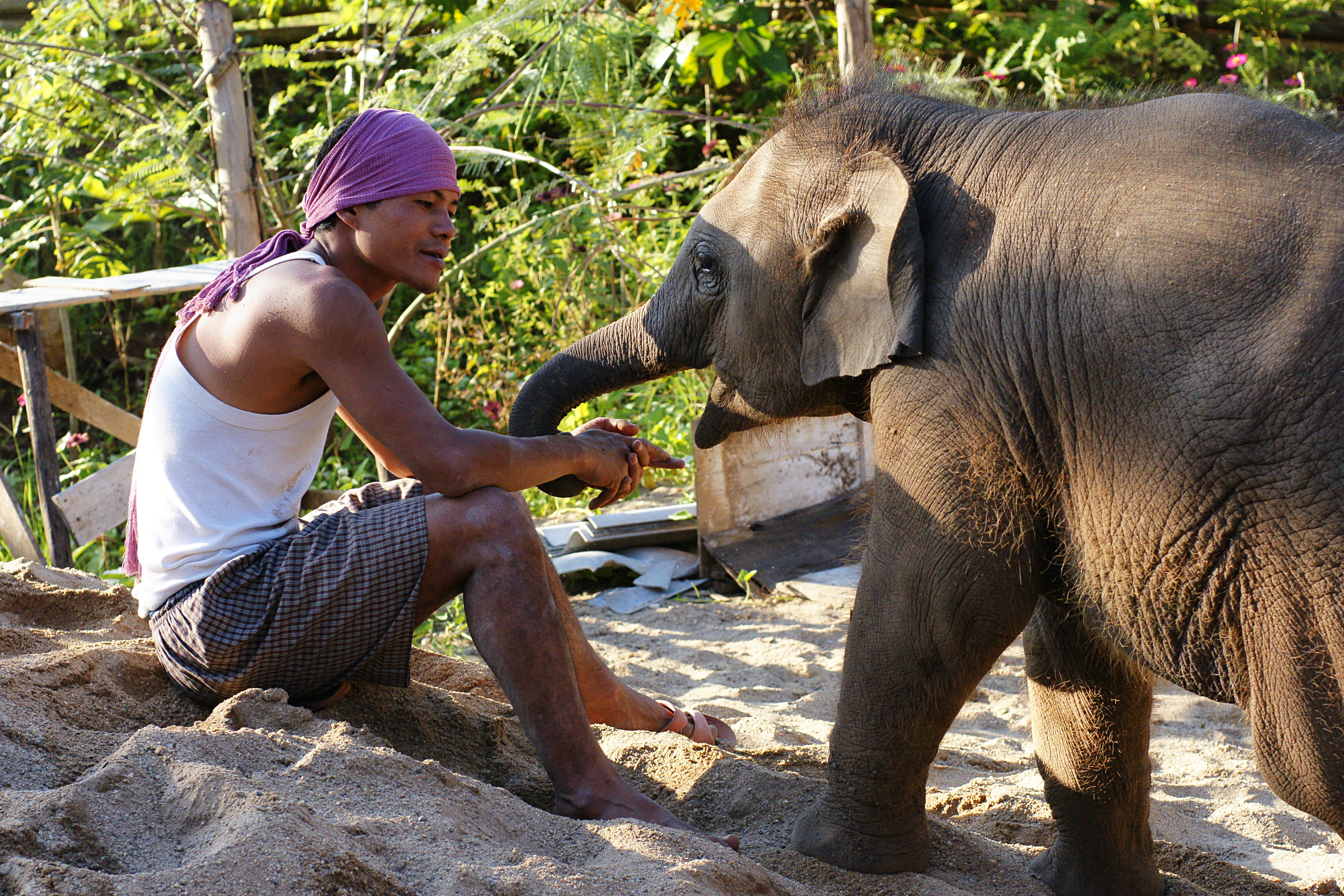
Mahout with young elephant

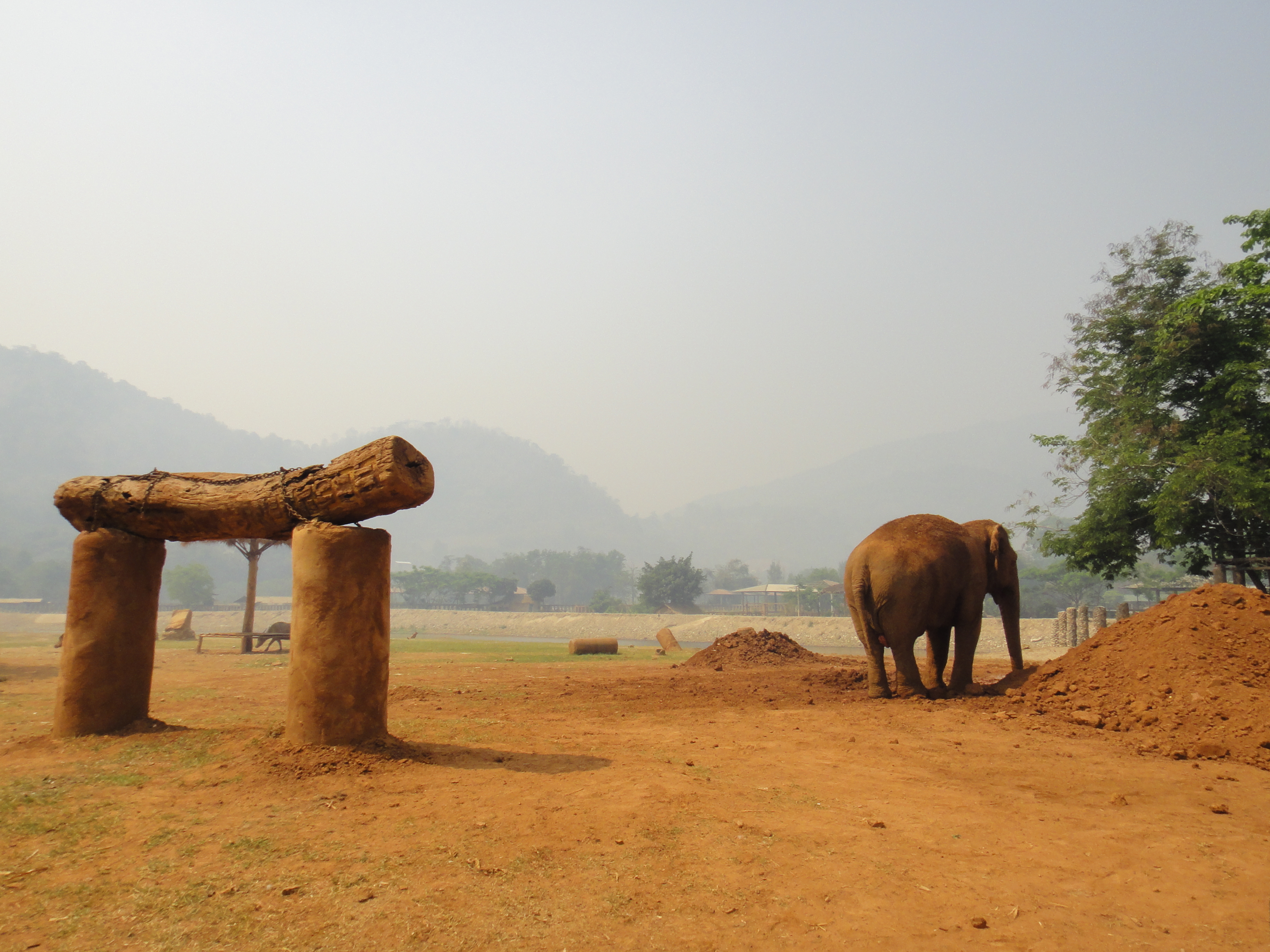
Elephant Nature Park, April 2024
