= Sangduen Chailert =

Thai animal welfare worker (born 1961)

- แสงเดือน ชัยเลิศ
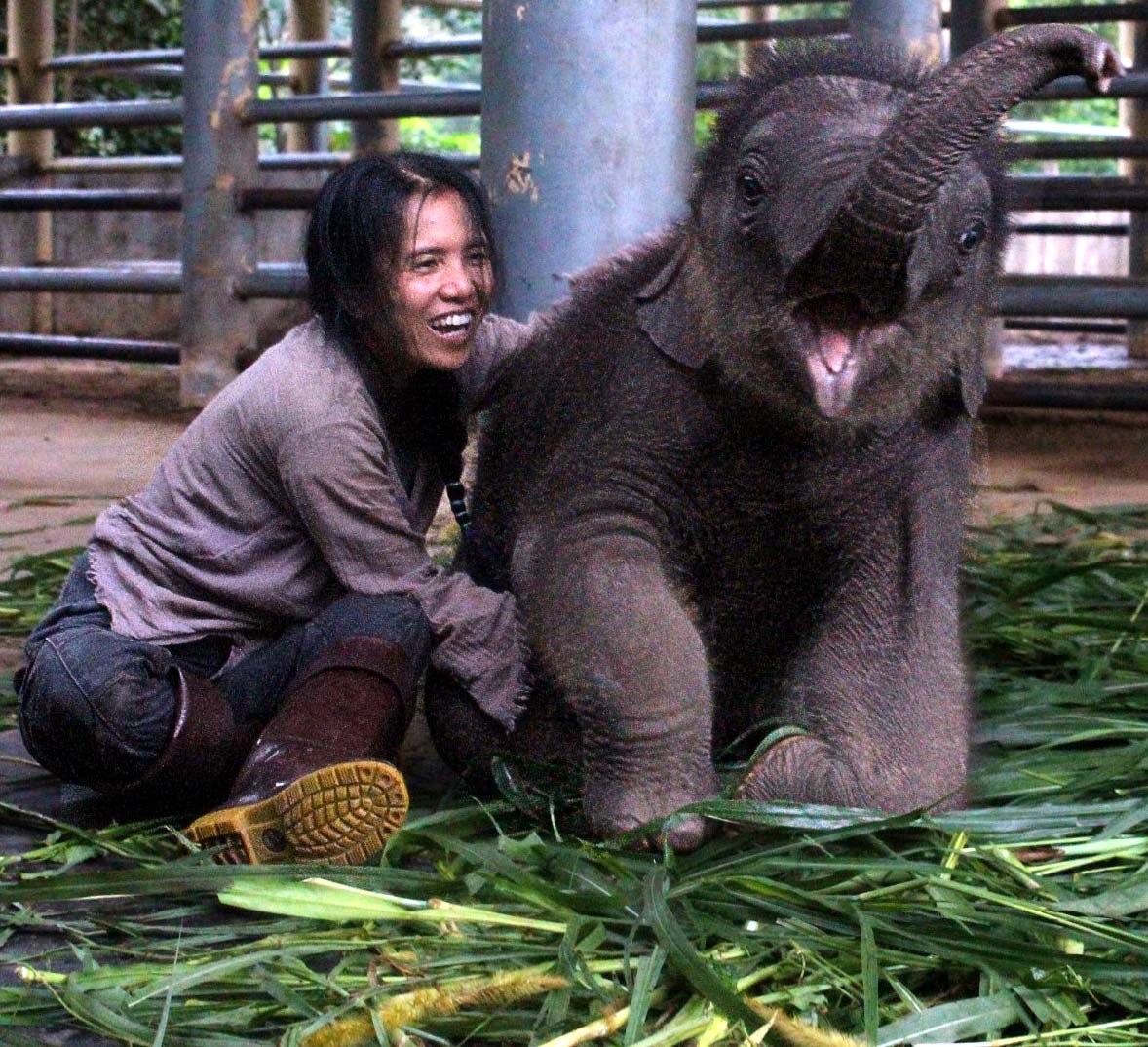
- Chailert with a newborn elephant, 2012
- Born: October 6, 1961 (age 64); Baan Lao, Chiang Mai province, Thailand
- Other name: Lek
- Education: Chiang Mai University
- Occupation: Animal welfare worker
- Known for: Founder of Elephant Nature Park

Sangduen "Lek" Chailert (Thai: แสงเดือน "เล็ก" ชัยเลิศ; born 6 October 1961) is a Thai animal welfare worker. She is the founder of Elephant Nature Park and the Save Elephant Foundation and is known for her activism for the welfare and protection of Asian elephants. Chailert has been described as "Thailand's elephant whisperer".

== Early life ==
Chailert was born in 1961 in the village of Baan Lao in northern Thailand. Growing up she was given the nickname "Lek", which means "small" in Thai. She was the granddaughter of a local shaman, and helped him take care of sick animals as a child. When she was 16, she saw elephants being mistreated while carrying logs in the jungle. Chailert later graduated from Chiang Mai University.

== Career ==
Chailert founded Elephant Nature Park, a sanctuary for abused Asian elephants spread over 250 acres of land in Chiang Mai province. The sanctuary has rescued over 200 elephants, in addition to other animals, such as 500 dogs, water buffalo, cows, cats, rabbits, horses, pigs and goats.

In addition, Chailert also established the Save Elephant Foundation, a non-profit organisation that advocates for the protection of Asian elephants. Chailert has advocated against the practice of phajaan to tame wild elephants, for which she received threats, including the poisoning of one of her rescued elephants.

Chailert has also been involved with the creation of conservation reserves for elephants and other animals in other parts in Thailand, as well as Cambodia, India and Laos, such as the Cambodia Wildlife Sanctuary and Elephant Sanctuary Laos.

Chailert campaigned for the rescue of Tikiri, an elephant in Sri Lanka.

== Recognition ==
Chailert has been featured in documentaries by National Geographic, Animal Planet, Discovery and the BBC. She was awarded a Genesis Award for the National Geographic documentary Vanishing Giants.

In 2001, the Ford Foundation named Chailert its "Hero of the Planet". In 2010, she was one of six women recognised as Global Conservation Female Heroes by Hillary Clinton in Washington D.C.. Time named Chailert as one of its "Heroes from Asia" in 2005.

In 2022, Chailert received the Legion of Honour in Bangkok from the President of France, Emmanuel Macron. That same year, the documentary The Elephant Rescuer of Thailand, documenting Chailert's efforts against elephant poachers and the impact of the COVID-19 pandemic on Elephant Nature Park, premiered.
