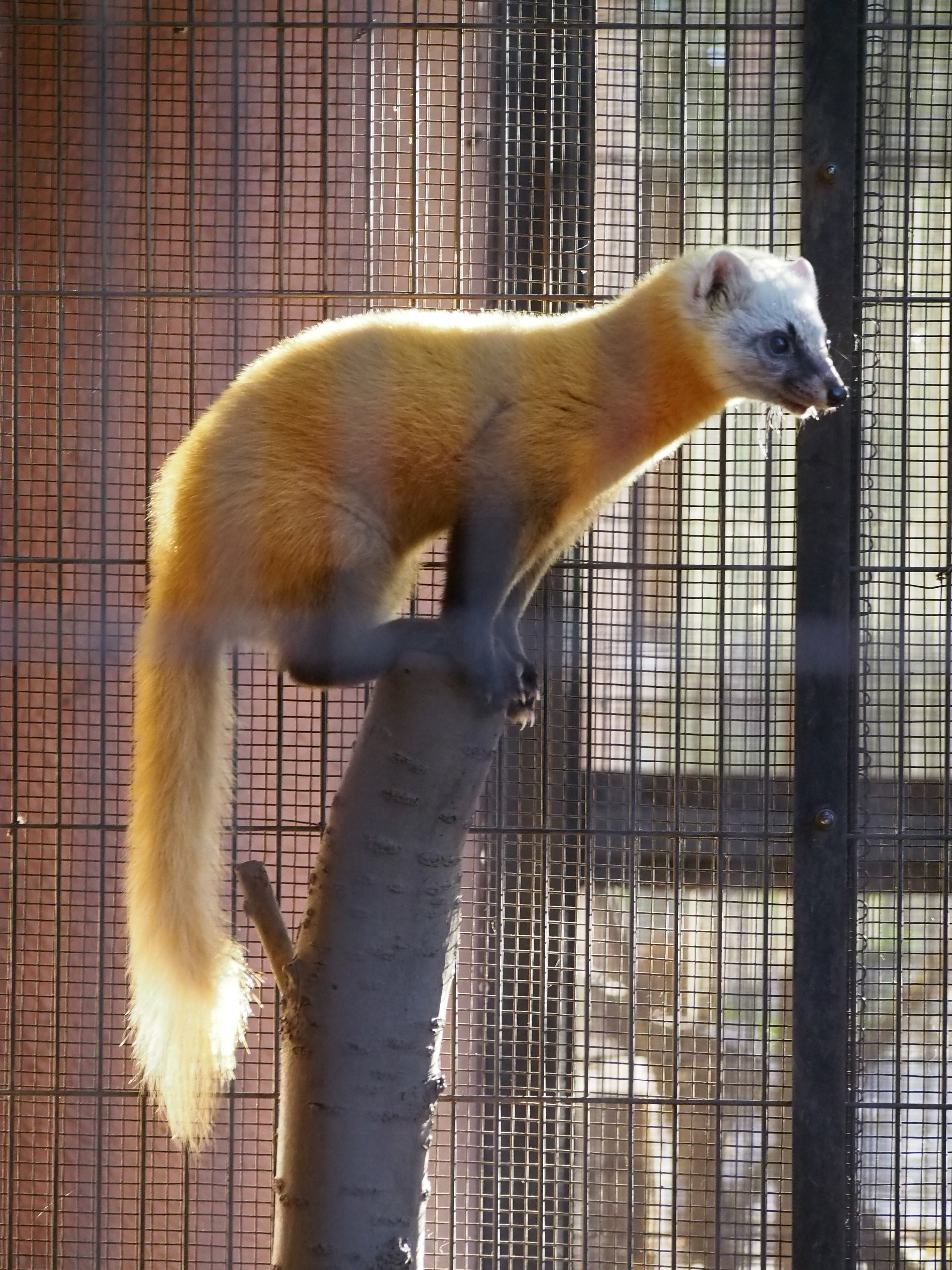
- Japanese marten in Inokashira Park Zoo, Tokyo

Conservation status
- Least Concern (IUCN 3.1)

Scientific classification
- Kingdom: Animalia
- Phylum: Chordata
- Class: Mammalia
- Order: Carnivora
- Family: Mustelidae
- Genus: Martes
- Species: M. melampus

Binomial name
- Martes melampus (Wagner, 1841)
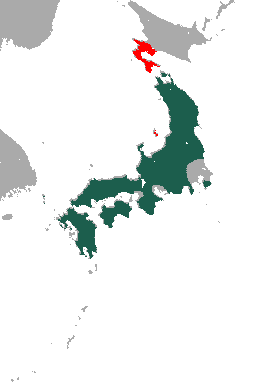
- Japanese marten range Green:native, Red:introduced

Synonyms
- Crocutictis melampus

= Japanese marten =

Species of carnivore

The Japanese marten (Martes melampus) is a marten species endemic to Japan. It is native to the forested regions of Honshu, Kyushu, Shikoku, and Tsushima, Japan. It is agile, territorial, and is important in seed dispersal in northern Japan's shrublands. Its coat varies depending on the region from yellow to brown. It is least concerned in conservations status despite habitat loss from logging and forest fragmentation. Conservation efforts include legal protection and habitat restoration.

In Japanese folklore it is associated with shapeshifting and omens.

== Description ==
It is 0.5 m (1.6 ft) in length typically, not including a 20 cm (8 in) long tail, and between 1 and 1.5 kg (2.2 and 3.3 lb) in weight. Males are generally larger than females. The pelage varies in color from dark brown to dull yellow with a cream-colored throat. Honshu and Kyushu martens have yellow fur coats, while Tsushima and Shikoku martens have brown fur coats.

== Diet and behavior ==
Both males and females are territorial; the size of each individual's territory depends on food availability. The Japanese marten is omnivorous, preferring meat from fish, frogs, and small birds and mammals, but consuming insects, fruit, and seeds when necessary. Its diet varies based on season and the environment, adapting to available food sources. In warmer months such as the spring and summer, it eats mammals (rodents and arthropods) and birds. Fruit is eaten all year, although the type of fruit depends on what is readily available. They feed off of existing carcasses in short increments of time to avoid competition with larger species such as bears. Some large animals are beneficial to martens, as they open up carcasses making food more accessible to them. It has a very good sense of smell to aid in food location.

== Taxonomy ==
The two confirmed subspecies of Japanese marten are:

- M. m. melampus lives on several of the Japanese islands.
- M. m. tsuensis is endemic to Tsushima Island.

It is most closely related to the sable (M. zibellina), with which it is sympatric on Hokkaido.

The Hokkaido population was artificially introduced and has no known ancestors.

Tsushima martens descend from a common ancestor (monophyletic clade) and have low genetic diversity. which makes them more susceptible to disease.

== Habitat ==
The Japanese marten prefers low-disturbed deciduous broad-leave forests and mixed forests due to the presence of fruit-bearing trees and vegetation for food and shelter. In the winter, the Japanese marten tends to go to the forests where it can get the most prey. In the summer, its habitat and diet become much more generalized, allowing it to live in a much more varied environment.

The Japanese marten can be found throughout regions in Japan with forests such as Honshu, Kyushu, Shikoku, and Tsushima Islands. Different populations in different regions have certain genetic traits making them unique from one another.

== Ecology ==
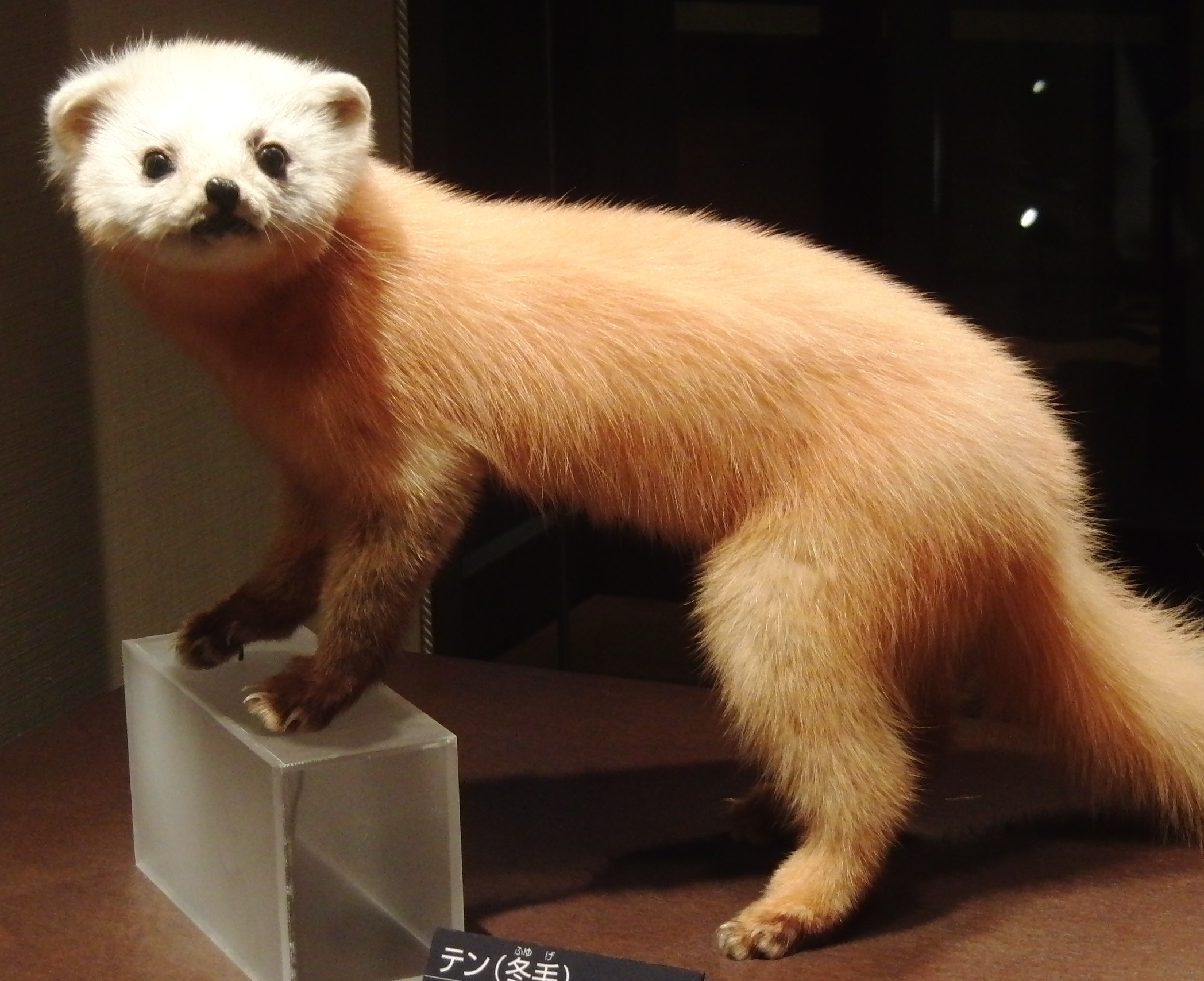
A stuffed specimen exhibited in the National Museum of Nature and Science, Tokyo

One of the biggest roles martens play in the environment is seed dispersal. Often this takes place in subalpine shrublands of northern Japan. Many fleshy fruits rely on birds and bats to disperse their seeds; however, in more northern climates, the numbers of these species decrease. With the decrease of these species also comes a decrease in seed dispersal. In these areas, carnivores with omnivorous diets, like the Japanese marten, can become the vector of dispersal. Dispersal occurs through feces, which contributes to forest regeneration and maintains diversity. These carnivores prove to be good dispersal mechanisms because they often have large home ranges leading to dispersal farther from the parent. Furthermore, since the carnivores are usually larger than birds or bats, they can carry and disperse larger seeds. Around 62% of the Japanese martens' feces contained one or more seeds.

== Reproduction and lifecycle ==
The Japanese marten breeds between March and the middle of May. Male testicles enlarge from April, peak in July, and regress by November. Female martens show physical signs of mating in the late summer through scratches and vulval enlargement. Males will mount and grab the female's nape, while females emit sounds during intercourse. This process usually lasts ~14-17 mins. Pregnancy lasts ~235-250 days while the embryo develops for 28-30 of those days.

During mid-April and early May, roughly two kits are born (sometimes four). Newborn kits weigh 25-30g (0.88-1.06 oz). They are born with fine gray hair and a white throat patch. Some milestones that are achieved include:

- Within the first 50 days: development of eyes, ears, teeth, etc.
- At 90-100 days they begin moving through trees.
- At 130 days females reach adult size.
- At 140 days males reach adult size.

Young martens (100-120 days old) they begin hunting independently. If it is winter, some will stay with their mother. Aggressive behavior begins at the five-month mark. They mature sexually between 1 and 2 years old. The average lifespan in the wild is unknown, although a specimen in captivity lived for a little more than 12 years. After reaching maturity, young martens often try to establish their territory. They mark their territory with scent marking.

== Effects on humans ==
Japanese martens have both positive and negative impacts on human activities in their habitats. Martens are known to prey on Japanese hares (Lepus brachyurus), which lower the quality of trees by their browsing. However, their prey also can include many insects which aid agriculture. They are also known to consume cultivated fruits like persimmons and apples. They will travel over 4 km (2.49 mi) just to eat these fruits.

== Threats and conservation efforts ==
The Japanese marten is classified as least concern on the IUCN Red List despite habitat loss and fragmentation. The biggest threat to the Japanese marten is the logging industry, which targets its preferred habitat of well-established forests. The industry often clear-cuts forests quickly destroying the creature's habitat without allowing it to recover. This practice also causes insularization of marten populations, in turn causing changes in foraging behaviors and the decrease of the genetic pool. Furthermore, pine plantations in their ecosystems do not contain important food for the martens.

Steps have been taken to try to conserve the martens. The most common are regulations on trapping. The species was named a Natural Monument Species in Japan in 1971, drawing attention to the species' vulnerability. The species also has been given legal protection on the Tsushima Island. Due to their habitat preference, they are vulnerable to disasters such as deforestation and habitat fragmentation. Unfortunately, conifer plantations have reduced the suitable habitats for these martens. To conserve the Japanese martens, efforts towards reforestation with more diverse forests have been instated. Habitat protection, genetic monitoring, and reducing population fragmentation are a few contributions that have been made to preserve the population. Reforestation and protecting existing low-disturbed forests also allow for less habitat loss.

== Legends ==
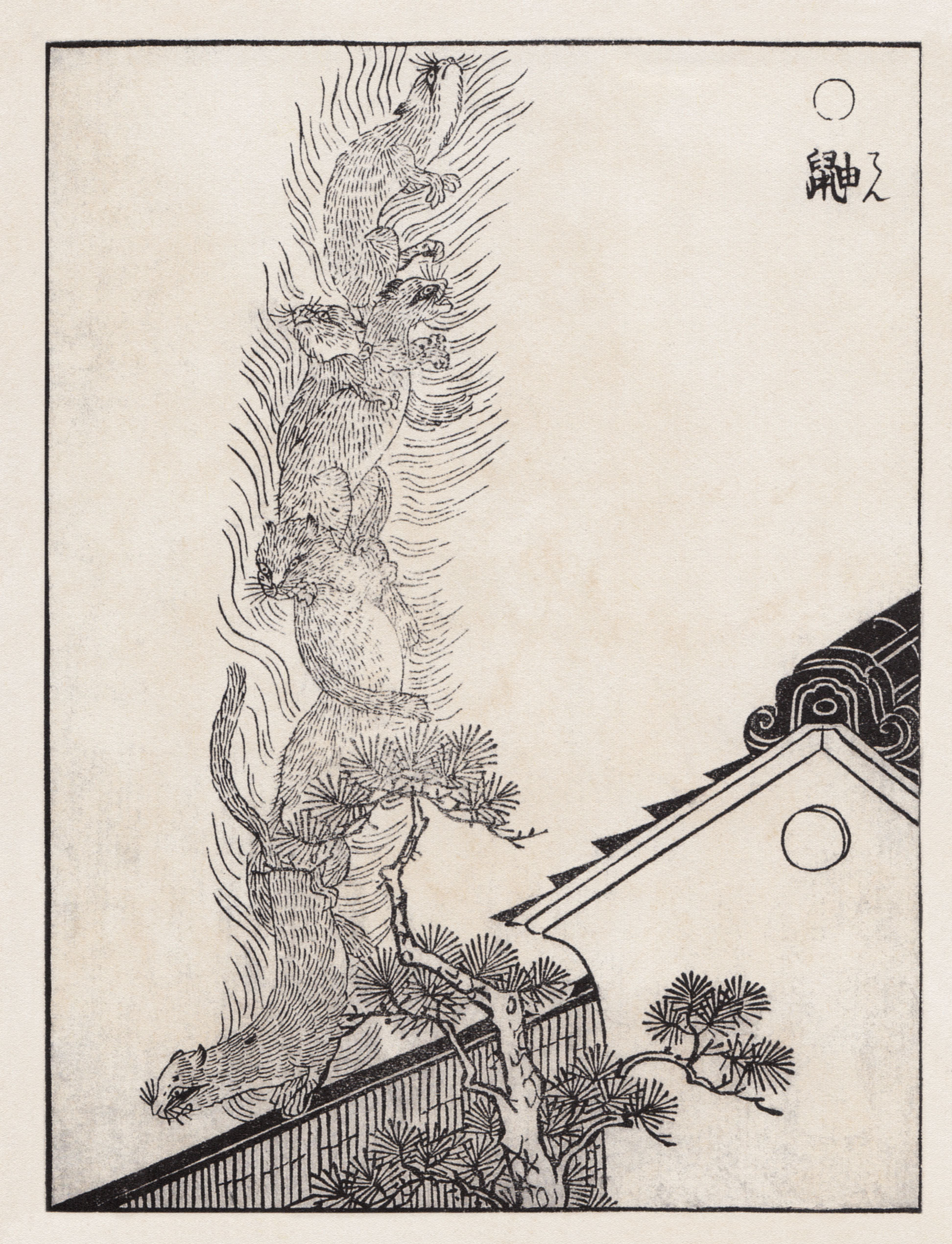
"Ten" from the Gazu Hyakki Yagyō by Sekien Toriyama

In the Iga region, Mie Prefecture, is a saying, "The fox has seven disguises, the tanuki has eight, and the marten has nine," and a legend relates how the marten has greater ability in shapeshifting than the fox (kitsune) or tanuki. In the Akita Prefecture and the Ishikawa Prefecture, if a marten crosses in front of someone, it is said to be an omen of bad luck (the weasel has the same kind of legend), and in the Hiroshima Prefecture, if one kills a marten, one is said to soon encounter a fire. In the Fukushima Prefecture, they are also called heko, fuchikari, komono, and haya, and they are said to be those who have died in avalanches in disguise.

In the collection of yōkai depictions, the Gazu Hyakki Yagyō by Sekien Toriyama, they were depicted under the title "鼬", but this was read not as "itachi" but rather "ten", and "ten" are weasels that have reached several years of age and became yōkai that have acquired supernatural powers. In the depiction, several martens have gathered together above a ladder and created a column of fire, and one fear about them was that if martens that have gathered together in this form appeared next to a house, the house would catch on fire.
