= Ziggy (elephant) =

Heavily abused elephant

- Species: Indian elephant (Elephas maximus indicus)
- Sex: Male
- Born: c. 1917
- Died: October 27, 1975 (aged 57–58); Brookfield Zoo, Chicago, Illinois, U.S.
- Cause of death: Old age
- Resting place: Field Museum of Natural History, Chicago, Illinois, U.S.
- Known for: Prolonged confinement
- Weight: 12,000 lb (5,400 kg)
- Height: Over 10 ft tall
- Named after: Florenz Ziegfeld

Ziggy (c. 1917 – October 27, 1975) was a male Indian elephant who lived at Brookfield Zoo outside Chicago from 1936 to 1975. He weighed about six tons and was over ten feet tall. After attacking and nearly killing his keeper in 1941, Ziggy was chained to the wall of an indoor enclosure, and remained there for nearly three decades. His confinement became a cause célèbre in the late 1960s, when schoolchildren and other animal enthusiasts began campaigning for his release. Ziggy was briefly allowed to go outside in 1970. One year later, the zoo completed a new specifically designed outdoor facility. Ziggy died in 1975.

== Early years ==
Born in Asia, Ziggy was named after Florenz Ziegfeld, who purchased the elephant from John Ringling in 1920. Ziegfeld thought the elephant, then a 250-pound youngster, would be a good birthday present for his six-year-old daughter. However, the elephant was sold back to Ringling after the animal reportedly trampled through the Ziegfelds' greenhouse. Ringling, in turn, sold the elephant to Singer's Midget Circus. While touring with Singer's troupe, Ziggy bonded with a little person named Charles Becker, who taught the elephant how to dance, play a harmonica, and smoke cigarettes.

At the San Diego Exposition Children's Circus in February 1936, Becker fell ill, and Ziggy was paired with a new handler, Johnny Winters. However, the elephant did not respond well to Winters, and fled from the grounds. Ziggy was later found in Balboa Park, and Becker was called from his sickbed to coax the elephant out. Some reports claimed Ziggy had killed a trombone player in the midst of his escape, but this was never verified. In any case, the circus decided it could no longer keep the elephant, and sold him to Brookfield Zoo. Ziggy arrived at Brookfield in July 1936 and became a popular attraction for visitors.

== Attack on Slim Lewis ==
At Brookfield Zoo on April 26, 1941, Ziggy suddenly turned on his keeper, George "Slim" Lewis. The elephant first struck Lewis to the ground with his trunk and pulled him beneath his head. Ziggy then tried to gore Lewis, but the keeper dodged each attack by slipping between the elephant's tusks. Eventually, Ziggy lunged so hard that his tusks became lodged in the ground for several seconds. Sensing his chance to escape, Lewis pulled himself up by grabbing onto Ziggy's ear, then punched the elephant in the eye. With Ziggy momentarily stunned, Lewis jumped into the moat around the elephant's enclosure and climbed to the other side.

Despite his ordeal, Lewis was an animal lover, and he begged zoo director Robert Bean to spare Ziggy's life. Bean decided that the animal would not be killed, but would be kept inside the Pachyderm House at all times as a safety precaution. Later that day, Lewis returned to Ziggy's yard and, with the help of another elephant, led the animal indoors. For the next few decades, the animal would remain alone in a stall, attached to a wall with a chain of variable length.

Years later, Lewis explained that Ziggy was in the midst of his musth period on the day of the attack. Musth is a time of high testosterone levels in male elephants, leading to aggressive behavior.

== Campaign to free Ziggy ==
In March 1969, Michael Sneed of the Chicago Tribune called attention to Ziggy's confinement, writing, "Ziggy's six-foot tusks, which once grew so long they crossed each other, now are decayed and broken. The once frequent majestic blasts from his huge trunk wail very rarely.... Ziggy refuses to face his visitors and turns toward the back wall, swaying back and forth, occasionally picking up stray articles of food thrown at him." The article caused a sensation, and Brookfield Zoo was inundated with letters about Ziggy. Peter Crowcroft, who had recently become the zoo director, announced that he wanted to let Ziggy go outdoors again. However, he explained that the zoo would need to build a new $50,000 facility to accommodate the elephant, something they could not afford at the time.

In response, people throughout the Chicago area, particularly schoolchildren, began collecting money for the "Ziggy Fund". Many elementary schools and high schools organized fundraisers, and the Bellwood Boys' Club made a five-foot-tall papier-mâché statue of Ziggy, which they paraded through the streets while collecting quarters. A number of donations also arrived from overseas, including several from American soldiers who had been stationed in Vietnam. In August 1970, the zoo received a major boost when William Sitwell, president of the Chicagoland Buick-Opel Dealers Association, pledged to match the money raised from individual sources.

As the Brookfield Zoo came closer to its $50,000 target, zoo officials decided they should see how Ziggy would react to being outdoors before building a new facility for the elephant. On September 23, 1970, Ziggy saw the sun for the first time in nearly thirty years when he was allowed to walk through a barricaded portion of his old yard. Slim Lewis traveled from Seattle, Washington, to escort the elephant outside. Ziggy stood at the doorway for about thirty minutes, then slowly came out and started eating a bale of hay. After exploring the yard for an hour and a half, Ziggy went back inside.

Ziggy's new outdoor facility was completed during the summer of 1971. Most of the $50,000 was spent on a remote control door, which would allow the elephant to go inside and outside without human intervention. Ziggy finally entered his new home on August 28, 1971, in front of more than one thousand cheering people. Over the next few months, the zoo added a wading pool to Ziggy's yard and refurbished his indoor stall.

== Later years ==
The next few years were generally quiet for Ziggy. In March 1975, he fell into the 8-foot (2.4 m) moat around his enclosure while trying to poke a zookeeper with his trunk. The elephant survived the fall, but broke a tusk and scraped his head. Workers poured 84,000 pounds (42 tons) of gravel into the moat to give Ziggy a ramp to climb. The elephant would not move for 31 hours, but when a zookeeper (Leroy Woodruff) opened a nearby door to a female elephant's enclosure, Ziggy decided to pull himself out. Once free, however, he ignored the female elephant and simply went toward his food.

A few months later, Ziggy laid down to rest in his indoor stall, rolled onto his side, and died while being bathed by Lewis. Zoo spokespeople said Ziggy had mainly died of old age, explaining that the animal's health had been declining long before he fell into the moat.

== Legacy ==
Ziggy's remains were given to the Field Museum of Natural History in Chicago, where his bones remain in storage. His skeleton was displayed for the "Specimens" exhibit in early 2017.

A children's book about Ziggy's life, Ziggy: The World's Greatest Elephant, was released in 1995. It was written by Tom Hollatz and illustrated by Ray Shlemon.

A Ziggy memorial made from obsidian with ivory made from Ziggy's tusks can be found at the Lizzadro Museum of Lapidary Art in Oak Brook, Illinois, in a diorama in their permanent collection.

== See also ==
- List of individual elephants
- Hanako, an elephant kept in solitary conditions in Japan who was the subject of a petition to improve her living conditions
