= Tchavdar Georgiev =

American writer and filmmaker

- Occupations: Writer, producer, director

Tchavdar Georgiev is an American writer, producer, director and editor of fiction and non-fiction films, TV commercials and television programs.

== Background ==
Georgiev received an MFA degree from the USC School of Cinematic Arts and a BFA from the School of the Art Institute of Chicago. He is a member of the American Cinema Editors and a recipient of National Endowment for the Arts and Open Society Institute grants.

== Film ==
Georgiev wrote, produced, and directed, with his colleague Amanda Pope, the PBS Independent Lens documentary The Desert of Forbidden Art. The film was nominated for two Emmys and won the Cine Golden Eagle Special Jury Award.

Georgiev edited the HBO documentary Valentine Road as well as the Cinema Eye Honors awarded Finders Keepers, He edited the four times Emmy-nominated PBS Independent Lens "Belly of The Beast," for which he also won an Emmy and the Netflix Original hit "The American Meme" that premiered at Tribeca Film Festival and Hot Docs Canadian International Documentary Festival. He wrote, co-produced and edited "Off The Rails" that premiered at Hot Docs and won numerous awards including Doc NYC. He wrote and produced "Mr. Toilet: The World's #2 Man" that won the Hot Docs for Schools Audience Award.

He wrote, co-produced and edited Off The Rails that premiered at Hot Docs and won awards at Doc NYC and the Newport Beach Film Festival. He wrote and edited Served Like a Girl that premiered at SXSW. He edited Skidrow Marathon, that won both LA Muse Best Doc and Audience Awards at the LA Film Festival.

He wrote on the Arte documentary "Beyond the Bolex" and edited on the Netflix Original Series "Song Exploder." He wrote and directed "Tokyo Giant: The Legend of Victor Starffin."

== Television ==
Georgiev directed and edited, in collaboration with Dana Berry, the National Geographic Finding the Next Earth and edited Alien Earths, which was nominated for a Prime Time Emmy. He was one of the editors on the documentaries We Live in Public (Grand Jury Prize at Sundance), One Lucky Elephant (Best Doc Editing Award at the Woodstock Film Festival) and the Russian narrative feature Bastards (MTV Russia Best Film Award).

Georgiev edited Divining the Human: The Cathedral Tapestries of John Nava, narrated by Edward James Olmos, as well as Marion's Triumph, narrated by Debra Messing which premiered on PBS. He was a researcher on the Sony Pictures Classics' documentary Red Army that premiered at the Cannes Film Festival and Participant Media's Countdown to Zero that premiered at Sundance Film Festival. He served as a consultant and/or additional editor on ABC "David Blaine: Beyond Magic," the Netflix Original "The Rachel Divide" and the Oscar shortlisted "Women of the Gulag."

Georgiev produced the feature thriller Nevsky Prospect for Amazon Studios and the award-winning documentary "Campesino." He has field produced for USA Network, History Channel, Simon Wiesenthal Center, SF1 (Switzerland), Channel 1 and MTV (Russia). He has line produced commercials for Adobe, Cisco, NASA and TELE2 Mobile Europe and edited for Honda, TELE2 and MTV Russia.
