= Inokashira Park Zoo =

Zoo in Tokyo, Japan

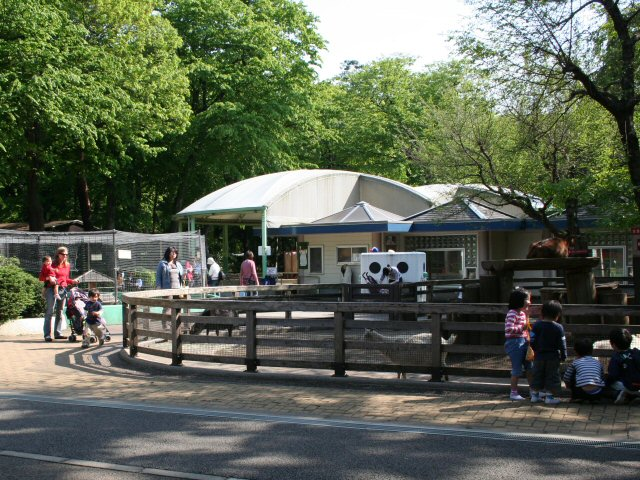
- Inokashira Park Zoo
- Interactive map of Inokashira Park Zoo
- 35°42′03″N 139°34′22″E
- Date opened: May 17, 1942; 84 years ago
- Location: Musashino, Tokyo, Japan
- Memberships: JAZA
- Website: www.tokyo-zoo.net

Inokashira Park Zoo (Japanese: いのかしらしぜんぶんかえん; Kanji: 井の頭自然文化園) is a city zoo in Musashino, Tokyo. It is in a corner of Inokashira Park near the Ghibli Museum. A branch of the zoo is in Mitaka. It opened on May 17, 1942.

== History ==
In September 1905, Shibusawa Eiichi borrowed a corner of Inokashira Gotenyama Garden from the imperial family and founded the Tokyo Maternity Hospital Conversion Division (later Inokashira School) to accommodate juvenile delinquents. On May 1, 1917, the entire town was granted to Tokyo and Inokashira Park was opened. On May 5, 1934, "Nakanoshima small animal zoo" opened at the current branch location.

In 1939, when the Inokashira school relocated, the plan to build a big zoo in this area was advanced. Initially it was conceived as "a big zoo" comparable to the Ueno Zoo, but due to the wartime budget and supplies shortage, large animals can not be gathered. The plan changed to a "nature observation park". It opened on May 17, 1942.

Two giraffes were bred at the time of the opening, but both died by the end of the war.

In the 1980s, the zoo experienced a surge of visitors when they received a pair of giant pandas.

== Overview ==
In 2006, to reduce the risk of breeding, the Ministry of the Environment moved some endangered Tsushima leopard cats to the zoo. Breeding restarted on February 22, 2008.

It is divided into a main zoo in Gotenyama, Musashino and a branch location in Inokashira, Mitaka. In the main park, mainly mammals and birds are raised, and waterfowl are kept in the garden surrounded by Inokashira pond. Also, there is a cultural museum, where special exhibitions and lectures or meetings are held. There was also a "tropical bird greenhouse", but on June 2, 2013, it closed due to its age. There is an aquarium with fish and amphibians in the secondary park.

A sculpture garden is in one corner of the park with works by Seibo Kitamura. In addition, a small amusement park (a merry-go round, teacups, train) is in another corner of the park.

== Animals ==
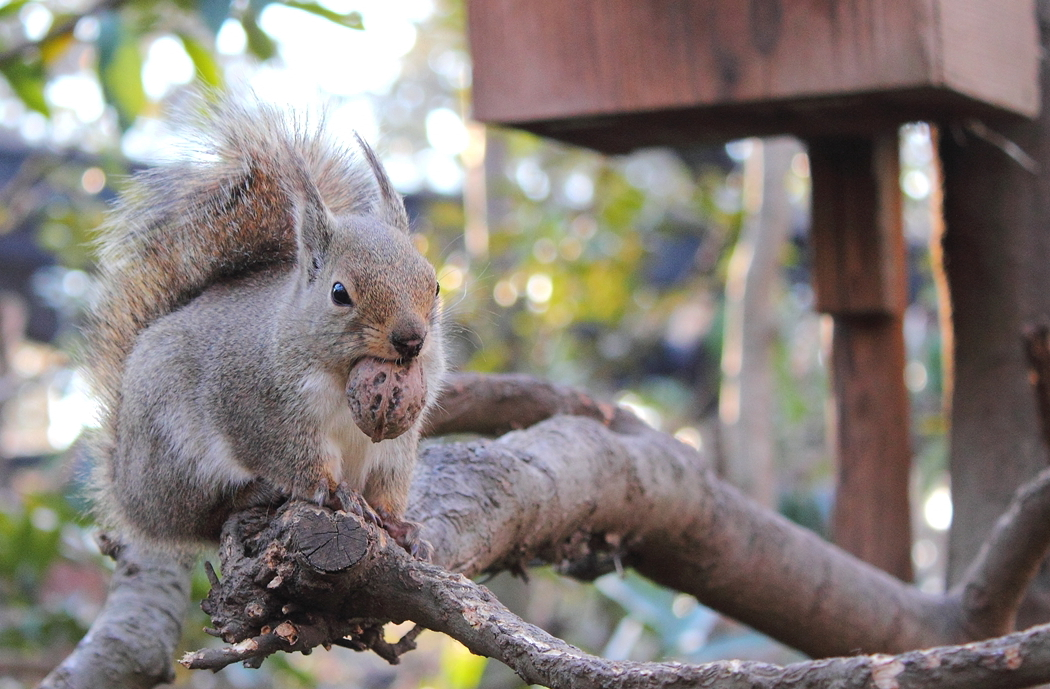
A Japanese squirrel

The zoo displays 170 animal species focusing on native species and a few exotic species.

=== Main Park ===
Japan's village forest

- Japanese badger
- Japanese marten
- Japanese raccoon dog
- Japanese rat snake
- Masked palm civet
- Red fox

Musashino Habitat

- Red-crowned crane
- Wild boar
- Yakushima sika deer

Wild Bird Forest and Japanese Bird House

- Azure-winged magpie
- Chinese bamboo partridge
- Copper pheasant
- Great tit
- Japanese quail
- Japanese scops owl
- Japanese sparrowhawk
- Japanese wood pigeon
- Lidth's jay
- Peregrine falcon
- Ural owl

Wildcat House

- Leopard cat (Amur & Tsushima subspecies)

Flying fox house

- Ryukyu flying fox

Monkey Mountain

- Rhesus macaque

Squirrel Trail

- Japanese squirrel

Exhibition hall

- Amami spiny rat
- Eurasian harvest mouse

Other animals

- Capybara
- Crested porcupine
- Eurasian otter
- Fennec fox
- Goat
- Guinea pig
- Humboldt penguin
- Japanese serow
- Patagonian mara
- Western barn owl

=== Aquatic Life Park ===
Aquatic Life House

- Common snapping turtle
- Daruma pond frog
- Diving beetle
- Diving bell spider
- Giant water bug
- Japanese brown frog
- Japanese common toad
- Japanese fire-bellied newt
- Japanese freshwater crab
- Japanese giant salamander
- Japanese pond turtle
- Japanese rice fish
- Japanese tree frog
- Japanese wrinkled frog
- Little grebe
- Musashi ninespine stickleback
- Tokyo bitterling
- Tokyo salamander

Waterside birds

- Black-faced spoonbill
- Cackling goose
- Call duck
- Common moorhen
- Common pochard
- Eurasian teal
- Eurasian wigeon
- Grey heron
- Japanese night heron
- Lesser white-fronted goose
- Mallard
- Mandarin duck
- Northern shoveler
- Oriental stork
- Red-crowned crane
- Swan goose
- Tufted duck
- Whooper swan

== Hanako ==
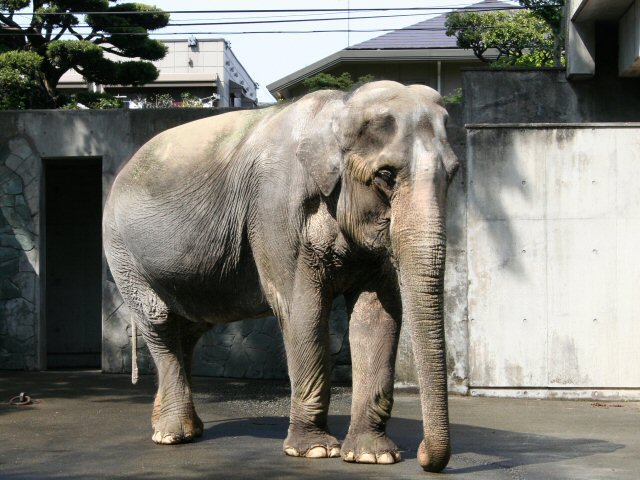
Hanako on April 28th, 2006

Hanako (1947–2016) was a female Asian elephant that was kept at the zoo. She was born in Thailand in 1947 and came to Japan after the war, gifted to Ueno Zoo in 1949. She inherited the name of the elephant "Hanako (Wanry)" who was starved to death during the war. On 5 March 1954 she was moved to Inokashira Park Zoo from Ueno Zoo.

In 1956, she stepped on and killed a man who was inebriated and trespassing before the garden opened. In 1960 she stepped on and killed a male keeper.

Her lower left teeth fell out in the 1980s, so she had to be fed on a liquid diet consisting of puréed banana and apple. In 2013, Hanako broke the longevity record of elephants raised in Japan. On May 26, 2016, she died at the age of 69.
