= Carol Buckley =

American elephant caregiver

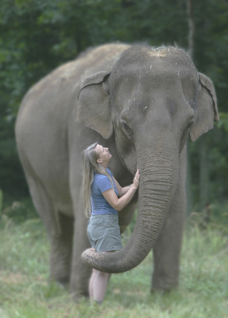
- Buckley and Winkie, 2004
- Born: May 18, 1954 (age 71); Oakland, California, US
- Education: Exotic Animal Training & Management Program, 1974 Moorpark College, California
- Occupation: Elephant Welfare Consultant
- Website: www.carolbuckley.com

Carol Buckley (born May 18, 1954) is an American elephant caregiver, specializing in the trauma recovery and on-going physical care of captive elephants.

In 1995, Buckley realized a decades long dream and retired her elephant, Tarra, to their private farm in Hohenwald, Tennessee, which later became The Elephant Sanctuary in Tennessee. In 2010, Buckley founded Elephant Aid International, and began consulting worldwide to help improve the lives of captive elephants and their mahouts.

== Education ==
While a student at Moorpark College in 1974, Buckley noticed a baby elephant, Fluffy, that a local tire dealer had bought to market his wares. Buckley volunteered to feed and care for the elephant, and a year later, borrowed $25,000, bought Fluffy, changed her name to Tarra, and founded Tarra Productions.

== Career ==
=== Tarra Productions ===
By 1980, when Tarra was six years old and a playful, pre-adolescent elephant, Buckley taught Tarra to roller skate. For their first 15 years together, Buckley lived with, cared for, trained, transported, and performed with Tarra in circuses and zoos in the US and Canada.

In 1984, Buckley began thinking that the life she and Tarra were living did not meet Tarra's psychological needs, and began to search for a better life for Tarra in a variety of zoos and animal parks where she worked and consulted, but the animal seemed to be bored in confinement. In the end, Buckley began looking for another option.

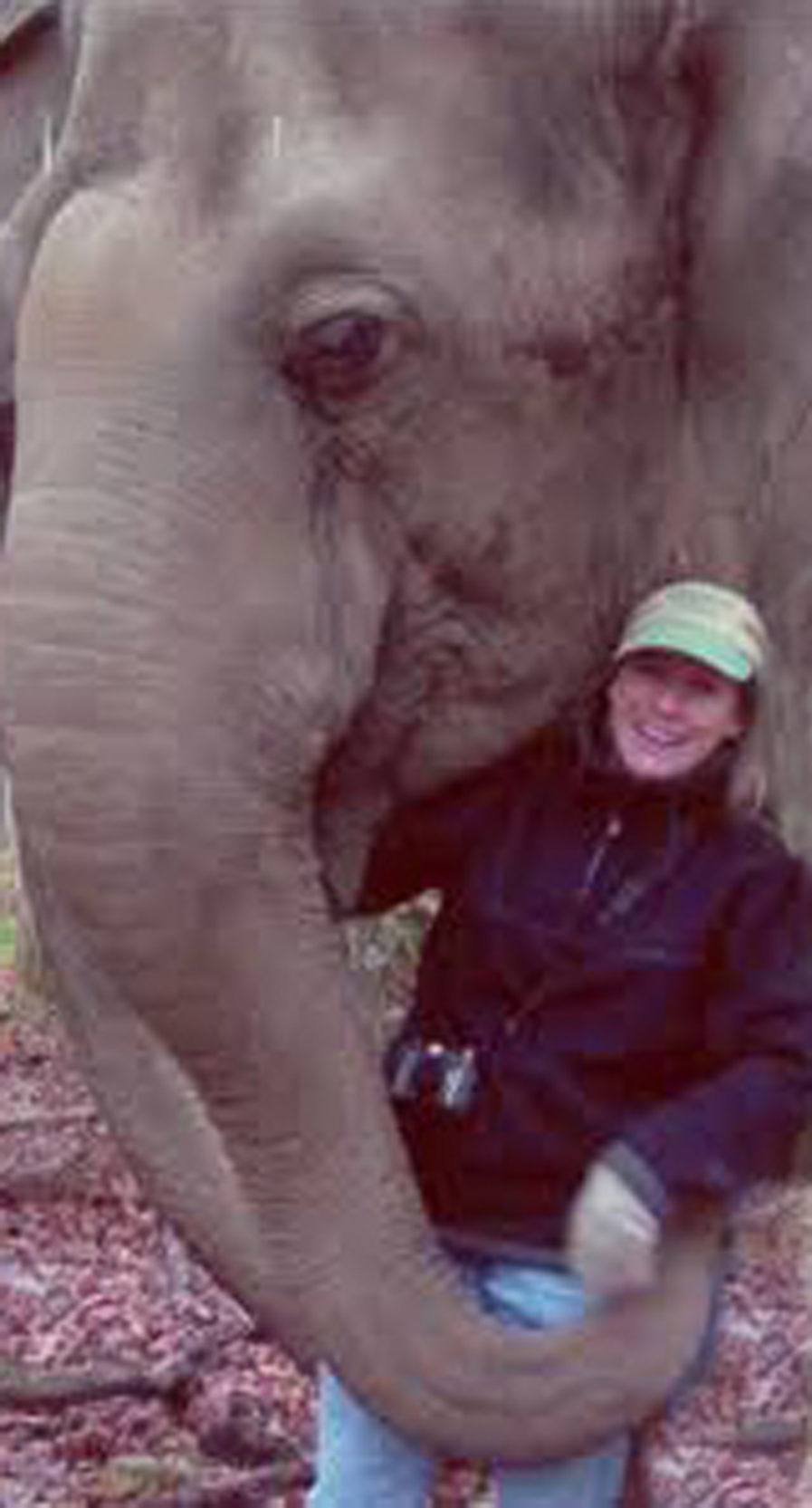
Buckley and Tarra

In November 1994, Buckley, with a bank loan, bought 112 acres in Hohenwald, Tennessee. Buckley built a barn for Tarra and co-founded The Elephant Sanctuary (Hohenwald) in Tennessee, the first natural habitat refuge for sick, old, and needy elephants. Today, the Elephant Sanctuary (Hohenwald) is 2,700 acres (1,100 ha), housing African and Asian elephants in three separate sections with four barns, enclosed by 20 miles (32 km) of fencing.

=== Elephant Aid International ===
After disagreements with her co-founders of the Elephant Sanctuary, Buckley parted ways, kept Tarra and, in 2010, she founded Elephant Aid International.

Since the founding of EAI, Buckley has spent months each year in Nepal, India, Thailand and Sri Lanka consulting on and providing elephant foot care, target training and Compassionate Elephant Management (CEM) for elephants and their mahouts, and, creating solar powered chain free corrals to get working elephants in Asia off chains.

In 2016, she was brought to Japan to review the care of Hanako, an elderly elephant who had been kept in isolation for decades.

==== Elephant Refuge North America (ERNA) in Attapulgus, GA ====
With knowledge gained from founding, creating, building and directing The Elephant Sanctuary (Hohenwald), as well as the knowledge gained from work on 'Chain Free Means Pain Free' projects and other elephant welfare projects in Asia, Buckley created Elephant Refuge North America (ERNA) in 2016. The new Elephant Refuge in North America is located in Attapulgus, Georgia a few miles north of Tallahassee Florida. Buckley chose this site because it provides elephants 850 acres of species suitable habitat to wander and explore day and night, including pastures, forests, lakes, around 50 inches rainfall year-round, mild winters, hot humid summers. In addition the site will provide live web cams for people to observe natural elephant behaviour in real time, and an international intern/education center.

== Selected works ==
=== Books ===
- 2002 – Travels with Tarra, Tilbury House Publishers, January, ISBN 978-0-88448-241-3.
- 2006 – Just for Elephants Tilbury House Publishers, November, ISBN 978-0-88448-283-3.
- 2009 – Tarra & Bella: The Elephant and Dog who became best friends, Putnam Juvenile, ISBN 978-0-399-25443-7. The story of an elephant and a dog and their bond. This story was broadcast on CBS News, and then featured on newscasts and internet sites around the world.

== Awards and honors ==
- 1998 – Time for Kids "Heroes for the Planet"
- 2012 – TARRA and BELLA chosen to represent the state of Tennessee at the 12th Annual National Book Festival in Washington, D.C. September 22–23.
