= The Elephant Sanctuary in Tennessee =

Non-profit organization

The Elephant Sanctuary In Tennessee
- Interactive map of The Elephant Sanctuary In Tennessee
- 35°32′53.9376″N 87°33′3.33″W
- Date opened: 1995
- Location: Hohenwald, Tennessee; United States
- Land area: 1,100 hectares (2,700 acres)
- No. of animals: 11
- No. of species: 2 species: Elephas maximus Loxodonta africana
- Annual visitors: not open to public
- Website: www.elephants.com

The Elephant Sanctuary in Tennessee in Hohenwald, Tennessee, is a non-profit organization licensed by the U.S. Department of Agriculture (USDA) and the Tennessee Wildlife Resources Agency (TWRA), and a member of both the Association of Zoos and Aquariums (AZA) and the Global Federation of Animal Sanctuaries (GFAS). Founded in 1995, The Sanctuary has provided a home to 32 elephants retired from zoos and circuses. The Elephant Sanctuary provides these elephants with a natural habitat, individualized care for life, and the opportunity to live out their lives in a safe haven dedicated to their well being. The elephant habitats are not open to the public.

At over 2,700 acres (11 km^{2}), the sanctuary consists of three separate and protected, natural habitat environments for Asian and African elephants; a 2,200-acre (9 km^{2}) Asian facility, a 200-acre (0.81 km^{2}) quarantine area and a 300-acre (1.2 km^{2}) African habitat.

The Elephant Sanctuary in Tennessee has a four-star rating from Charity Navigator.

== History ==
In 1995, Carol Buckley purchased a 113 acre parcel of land in Lewis County, Tennessee, and built a barn to retire her elephant, Tarra. Shortly after, The Elephant Sanctuary (TES) was established and acquired their non profit status. In 1999, the property was purchased from Buckley by the non profit organization. Buckley was the guarantor for the loan for a second barn added in 1999 at which time four elephants had been rescued and living with Tarra. In 2001, a 700-acre (2.8 km^{2}) section of land with a 25-acre (100,000 m^{2}) lake was acquired. Another 1,840 acres (7 km^{2}) were purchased and the sanctuary expanded to 2,700 acres (11 km^{2}) in 2003. Again, Buckley was the guarantor for the loan. The first two African elephants were accepted for the new African habitat in 2004. The existing herd of Asian elephants was relocated to a new 2,200 acres (9 km^{2}) habitat to accommodate eight incoming elephants who needed to be quarantined in 2005. This new area includes a 22,000 sq ft (2,000 m^{2}) barn and 20,000 sq ft (2,000 m^{2}) hay barn which is able to hold up to 35,000 bales of hay.

== Facilities ==
The development of the Sanctuary was done in several stages. It was originally built in phases and then expanded whenever funding was available or the elephants needed more space or accommodation. Twenty miles of double fencing encloses The Elephant Sanctuary's 2,700 acres (11 km^{2}). Heated barns located in the Asia, Africa, and Quarantine Habitats offer additional warmth during the cooler winter months. The Asia and Africa barn designs were conceptualized by the co-founders and were constructed using Leadership in Environmental and Energy design plans. The facilities have many features that protect the environment and reduce their carbon footprint.

As of 2025, fourteen elephants have homes at the Elephant Sanctuary.

== Education ==
The Elephant Sanctuary's Elephant Discovery Center, opened in 2019, hosts drop-in visitors Saturdays 9 AM to 4 PM. Although the visitors cannot physically see the elephants (in keeping with Sanctuary philosophy), they can interact with staff and watch the elephants via live-streaming EleCams. The Discovery Center also provides in-person programs for school groups, civic/social groups, and the general public upon request.

The Sanctuary also has a web-based Distance Learning program that allows The Sanctuary to link up with classrooms and other audiences online. These programs are also available upon request.

== See also ==
- Elephant sanctuary
