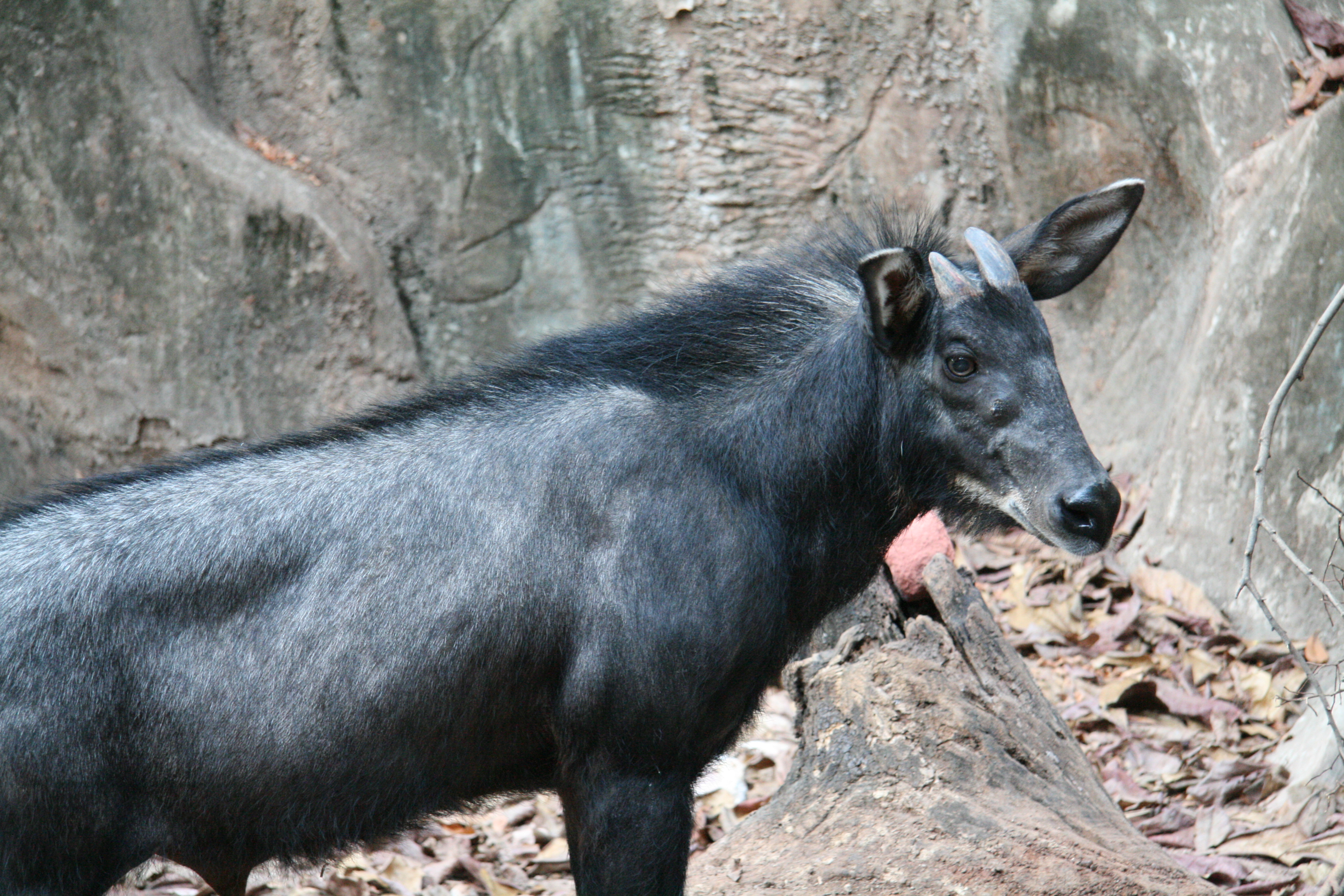
- A Sumatran serow at Dusit Zoo

Conservation status
- Vulnerable (IUCN 3.1)

Scientific classification
- Kingdom: Animalia
- Phylum: Chordata
- Class: Mammalia
- Order: Artiodactyla
- Family: Bovidae
- Subfamily: Caprinae
- Genus: Capricornis
- Species: C. sumatraensis
- Subspecies: C. s. sumatraensis

Trinomial name
- Capricornis sumatraensis sumatraensis (Bechstein, 1799)

= Sumatran serow =

Subspecies of goat-antelope (Capricornis sumatrensis)

The Sumatran serow (Capricornis sumatraensis sumatraensis), also known as the southern serow, is a subspecies of the mainland serow native to mountain forests in the Thai-Malay Peninsula and on the Indonesian island of Sumatra. It was previously considered its own species, but is now grouped under the mainland serow (Capricornis sumatraensis), as all the mainland species of serow (Chinese, red and Himalayan) were previously considered subspecies of this species. The Sumatran serow is threatened due to habitat loss and hunting, leading to it being evaluated as vulnerable by the IUCN.

== Physical characteristics ==
The Sumatran serow has a stocky build, standing about 85-94 cm tall at the shoulder.

It has coarse, dark fur, ranging from black to grayish, which helps it blend into the forest undergrowth.

Both males and females have backward-curving horns, which are relatively short but thick.

== Distribution and habitat ==
The Sumatran serow (Capricornis sumatraensis) is found throughout Southeast Asia, including the island of Sumatra, the Malay Peninsula, southern Thailand, and parts of Myanmar. It inhabits rugged, forested, and mountainous terrains, often in remote and rocky areas. Due to habitat loss and fragmentation, its populations are sparse and scattered, making it a vulnerable species across its range.

== Behavior and diet ==
The serow is primarily a solitary animal, although it may occasionally be seen in small groups.

Its diet consists of grasses, leaves, fruits, and shrubs, making it an herbivore adapted to the varied vegetation found in its habitat.

== Threats ==
The Sumatran serow (Capricornis sumatraensis) faces severe threats from illegal hunting and trade across Southeast Asia, driven by demand for its meat, traditional medicine, and trophies. Poached from remote mountainous regions, its parts are trafficked across borders through organized wildlife networks. Weak enforcement, porous borders, and high demand exacerbate the issue, leading to population declines and biodiversity loss. Efforts to combat this illegal trade include stronger laws, international cooperation, and public awareness campaigns, though challenges persist in effectively curbing this wildlife crime.

== Conservation status ==
The Sumatran serow is classified as Vulnerable by the IUCN due to habitat loss, poaching, and deforestation, which threaten its population. It is also hunted for its meat and traditional medicine use.

Conservation efforts are ongoing, with a focus on protecting its natural habitat in Sumatra's forests and implementing anti-poaching measures.

The Sumatran serow remains one of Southeast Asia's lesser-known, yet fascinating, species that is vital to the biodiversity of the region's ecosystems.
