= Yuan Bao =

Female giant panda (born 2020)

- Yuan Bao as a cub with her mother, Yuan Yuan, in 2020
- Sex: Female
- Born: June 28, 2020 (age 6); Taipei Zoo, Taipei, Taiwan
- Parent: Tuan Tuan and Yuan Yuan

Yuan Bao (Note: simplified Chinese: 圆宝; traditional Chinese: 圓寶; pinyin: Yuán bǎo; lit. 'Round baby') (born June 28, 2020) is a female giant panda born at the Taipei Zoo in Taiwan. Her parents are Tuan Tuan and Yuan Yuan, and she has an older sister named Yuan Zai. Yuan Bao is the second giant panda born in Taiwan.

Yuan Bao's name was revealed on August 30, 2020, following a contest. She was unable to drink colostrum as an infant and relied on Yuan Yuan's breast milk past the age of two. Yuan Bao often slid or crawled until her hind legs were strong enough to allow her to walk; when she sat down, netizens compared her back to an onigiri. Yuan Bao has been living away from her mother since she was two and a half years old.

== Early life and family ==
Yuan Bao was born on June 28, 2020, at the Taipei Zoo in Taiwan, to mother Yuan Yuan and father Tuan Tuan (died 2022). Her parents were brought to Taipei from Sichuan on December 23, 2008; in exchange, the Taiwanese government gave China two Taiwanese Serow and two Formosan sika deer on April 16, 2011. Yuan Bao is the second giant panda to be born in Taiwan; the first was her older sister, Yuan Zai (born July 6, 2013). She and her sister were born as the result of artificial insemination. Yuan Bao's maternal grandmother was Lei Lei (died September 9, 2020).

=== Development ===
When she was born, Yuan Bao was unable to drink colostrum, and she has an L-shaped scar on her back, which appeared when Yuan Yuan accidentally bit her. Yuan Bao's name was revealed on August 30, 2020, following a contest. Until then, she was known as "Yuan Zai Mei" (Note: simplified Chinese: 圆仔妹; traditional Chinese: 圓仔妹; pinyin: Yuán zǐ mèi; lit. 'Yuan Zai's Little Sister') and her nickname Rou Rou came in second place. (Note: Chinese: 柔柔; pinyin: Róu róu) The naming ceremony coincided with Tuan Tuan's upcoming 16th birthday.

On October 5, 2020, the zoo announced that Yuan Bao was having difficulty learning how to walk, since her hind legs lacked sufficient strength. She primarily crawled and slid on the ground instead. Yuan Bao attracted a large amount of netizens, who commented that her back resembled an onigiri when she sat down. By the time she turned two years old, she was able to walk normally.

Yuan Bao made her public debut on December 29, 2020. Her first birthday was livestreamed on June 28, 2021, as the Taipei Zoo was closed due to the COVID-19 pandemic. During the celebration, she participated in zhuazhou, which featured bamboo sticks she could choose from. Each bamboo stick corresponded to an occupation related to animal conservation. The words "stay home" were written on her cake as a reminder to the public.

== Life and impact ==
When Yuan Bao was two years old, she was still breastfed by Yuan Yuan, who, according to news outlet ETtoday, was becoming elderly. Furthermore, zookeepers revealed in March 2022 that Yuan Bao and Yuan Yuan had been playing tug of war over food, since the two giant pandas were convinced that the other's meal tasted better. The zoo's director promised that by the end of 2022, Yuan Bao would live independently from her mother. Yuan Bao celebrated her third birthday without Yuan Yuan, whom she had been raised separately from since she was two and a half years old. She celebrated her sixth birthday on June 28, 2026, but the Taipei Zoo was closed due to annual maintenance, so she did not receive any visitors. As of July 2026, she lives with Yuan Zai and Yuan Yuan.

In a China Review News Agency article, Taipei Zoo director Chen Yicong said that the presence of Yuan Bao and her family improved tourism at the zoo, with 1.9 million visitors in 2022. She compared the ownership of Taiwanese giant pandas to the ones at Ueno Zoo, who are considered Chinese property.
