= Tuan Yuan =

Tuan Yuan (simplified Chinese: 团圆; traditional Chinese: 團圓; lit. 'Reunion') may refer to:

- Apart Together, 2010 Chinese film
- Wax and Wane, 2011 Hong Kong TV series

== See also ==
- Tuan Tuan and Yuan Yuan, giant pandas at Taipei Zoo, Taiwan
