= Tuan Tuan and Yuan Yuan =

Chinese giant pandas gifted to the Taipei Zoo

Tuan Tuan
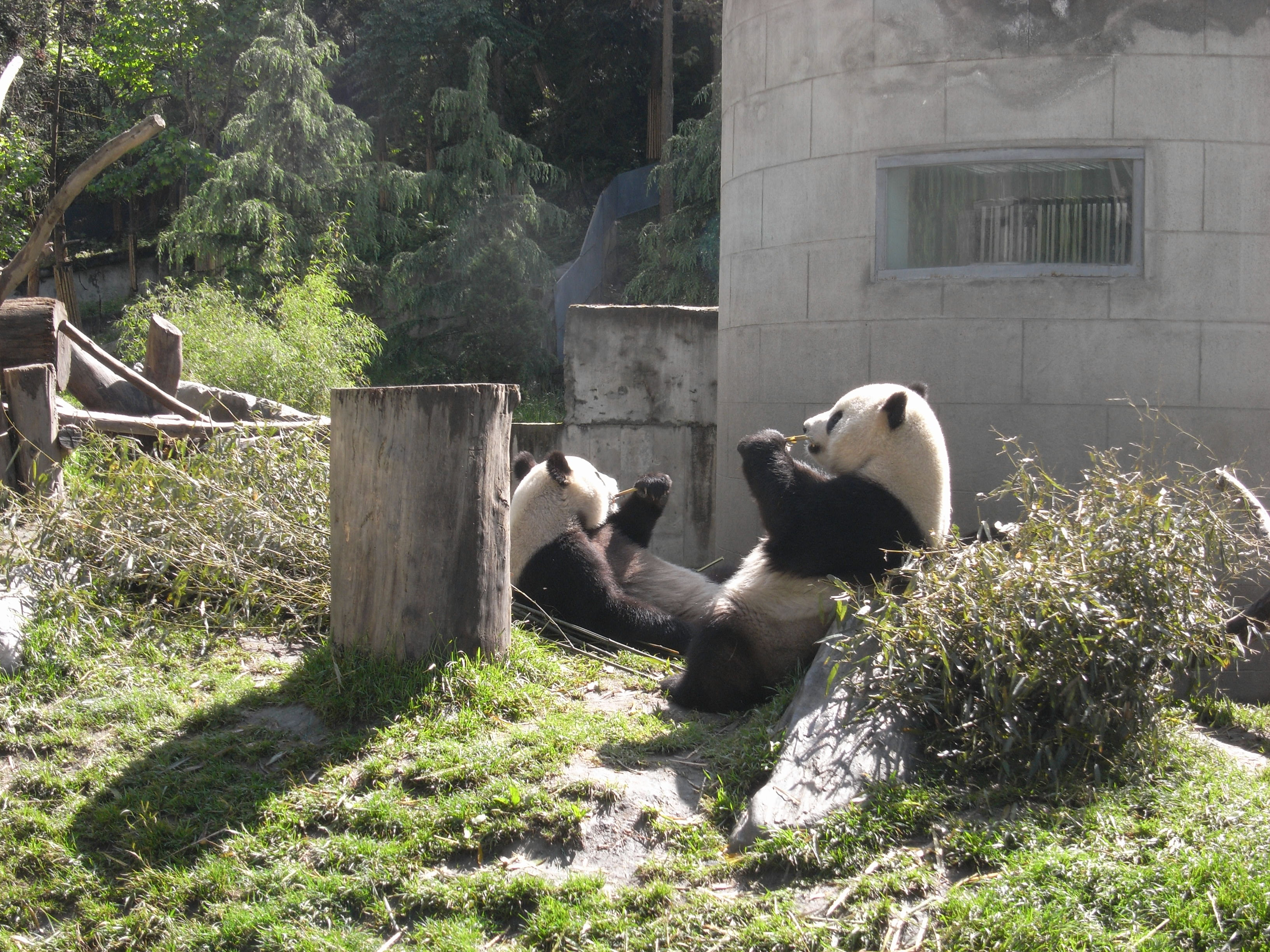
- Tuan Tuan (right) and Yuan Yuan (left) chewing on bamboo in Wolong shortly after the 2008 Sichuan earthquake
- Species: Giant panda
- Sex: Male (Tuan Tuan); Female (Yuan Yuan)
- Born: 1 September 2004 (Tuan Tuan); 31 August 2004 (age 22) (Yuan Yuan); Wolong National Nature Reserve, China
- Died: 19 November 2022 (aged 18); Taipei Zoo, Taiwan
- Cause of death: Gemistocytic astrocytoma (Tuan Tuan)
- Offspring: Yuan Zai; Yuan Bao

Tuan Tuan (simplified Chinese: 团团; traditional Chinese: 團團; pinyin: Tuán Tuán; 1 September 2004—19 November 2022) and Yuan Yuan (simplified Chinese: 圆圆; traditional Chinese: 圓圓; pinyin: Yuán Yuán; 31 August 2004) were two giant pandas that were gifted by China to Taiwan in 2008 as part of a cultural exchange program. The idea was first proposed in 2005, but the previous Taiwanese administration in Taipei had initially refused to accept the pandas.

After elections that resulted in a change of president and the government in 2008, the Taiwanese government accepted the pandas, and they arrived on December 23, 2008. The two names were selected by a vote in China and their combination, Tuan Yuan, means "reunion" (simplified Chinese: 团圆; traditional Chinese: 團圓; pinyin: Tuán Yuán) in the Chinese language. The pandas are housed at Taipei Zoo and have been exhibited to the public since Chinese New Year 2009. One of the pandas, Tuan Tuan, died in November 2022.

== Birth ==
Tuan Tuan, male, was born to Hua Mei on 1 September 2004, and was assigned as no. 19 in the Wolong National Nature Reserve in Sichuan. Yuan Yuan, female, was born on 31 August 2004, and was assigned as no. 16 in the Wolong National Nature Reserve. Their names, "Tuan Tuan" and "Yuan Yuan", were chosen in an unofficial public poll in mainland China the results of which were revealed live on national television during the 2006 CCTV New Year's Gala. Approximately 130 million mainland Chinese viewers cast their votes. Together, the names produce the Chinese phrase tuan yuan (simplified Chinese: 团圆; traditional Chinese: 團圓; pinyin: Tuán Yuán), meaning "reunion".

== Proposal, initial resistance and acceptance ==
The exchange of the pandas was first proposed during the 2005 Pan-Blue visits to mainland China, when politicians from the then-Opposition Pan-Blue Coalition, which is comparatively pro-unification in stance, visited mainland China. Chen Yunlin, then the head of the State Council Taiwan Affairs Office, announced on 3 May 2005, that Beijing would present two giant pandas to Taipei as part of an exchange program.

The two pandas to be sent to Taiwan were chosen after 218 days of observation and discussion by experts from both mainland China and Taiwan, and were officially announced on 6 January 2006. The Chinese Wildlife Protection Society then began seeking nominations for the names to be given to the pandas. These were announced on the eve of Chinese New Year 2006 on the CCTV New Year's Gala live on national television. An opinion survey in Taiwan conducted by United Daily News in response to the exchange proposal found 50% of respondents in favour of accepting the pandas, and 34% opposed.

However, the exchange proposal soon met with political resistance from the Democratic Progressive Party (DPP). On March 31, 2006, the Agricultural Committee of the Executive Yuan in Taiwan decided not to issue permits for the importation, ostensibly on the grounds that the zoos in Taiwan applying for the importation did not meet facility and resource requirements for the proper care and rearing of the pandas, and that importation would not be in the best interest of protecting pandas. However, commentators generally observed that political considerations underlay the technical decision, with the independence-leaning President Chen Shui-bian being opposed to what he saw as a propaganda move by Beijing.

In 2008, Ma Ying-jeou, of the Kuomintang (KMT), was elected president, and over the next few months forged stronger economic and political relations with mainland China under his presidency, and was willing to accept them. The offering of pandas a gift from mainland China is often known as panda diplomacy, and Taipei Zoo expected to draw around 30,000 visitors a day as a result of their arrival. The move was criticized by supporters of Taiwan's independence and the opposition Democratic Progressive Party, who said that "Tuan Tuan and Yuan Yuan means a union, which perfectly matches Beijing's goal of bringing Taiwan into its fold."

Although Taiwan is not a CITES signatory and is therefore not obligated to report to the CITES Secretariat, the Secretariat of CITES said in response to the transfer that it viewed the transfer as an intrastate matter, and thus would be governed by whatever procedures and documentary requirements that are agreed upon by the Beijing and Taipei authorities. Both sides adopted procedures similar to standard CITES procedures for international transfers. On the import-export permits, the origin was listed as the Wolong Nature Reserve Management Office, while the destination was listed as the Taipei City Zoo.

== Arrival in Taiwan and reaction ==
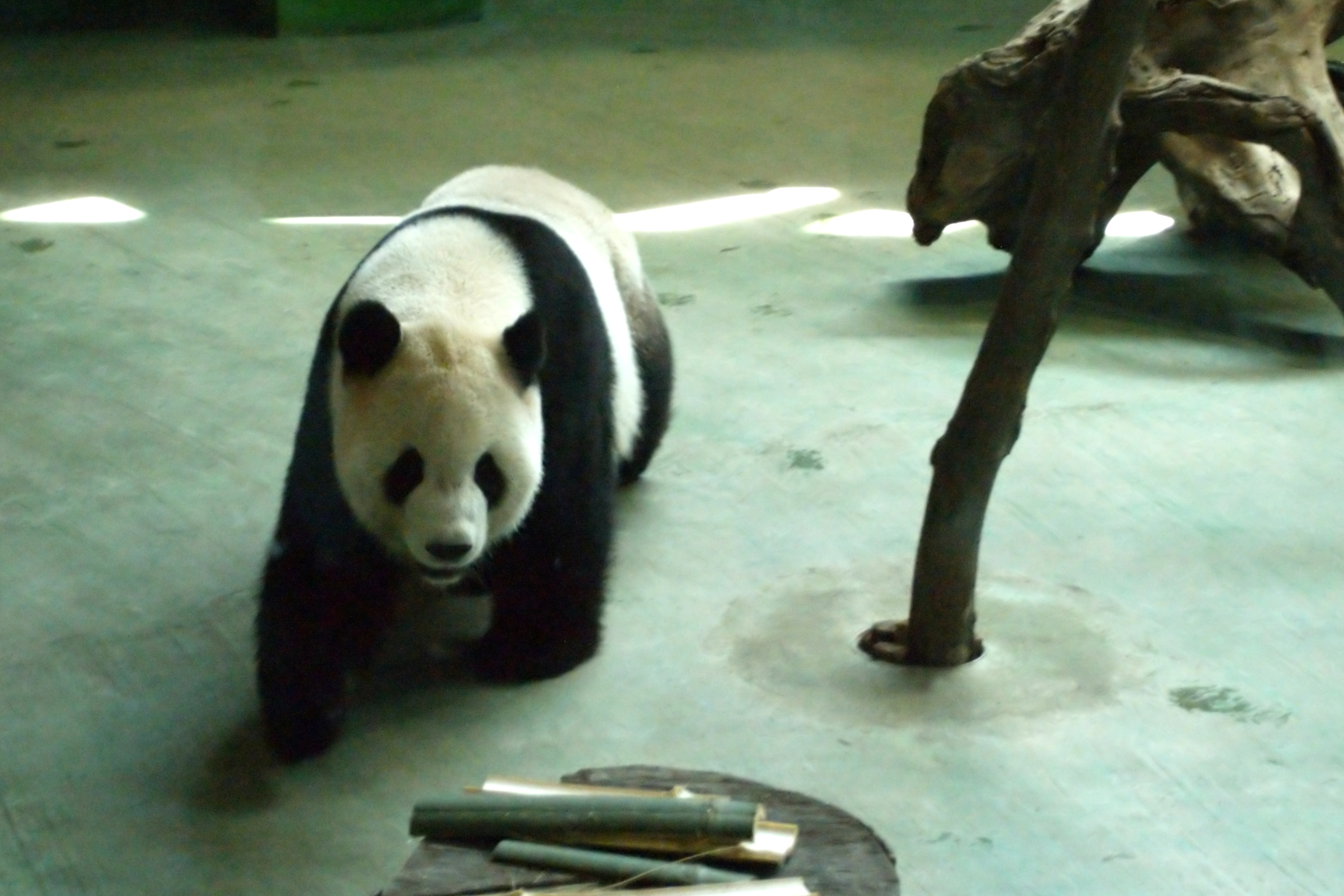
Tuan Tuan at Taipei Zoo

Tuan Tuan and Yuan Yuan arrived in Taiwan aboard an EVA Air flight on December 23, 2008, and were transported to Taipei Zoo. The arrival of the pandas was met with intense public attention, described by the press as "Pandamania", with the pandas becoming instant celebrities. A variety of merchandise appeared, and even buses were redecorated in panda-themed livery.

At the same time, there was political controversy. The opposition DPP saw the pandas as a propaganda move by Beijing.

=== Health ===
==== Tuan Tuan ====
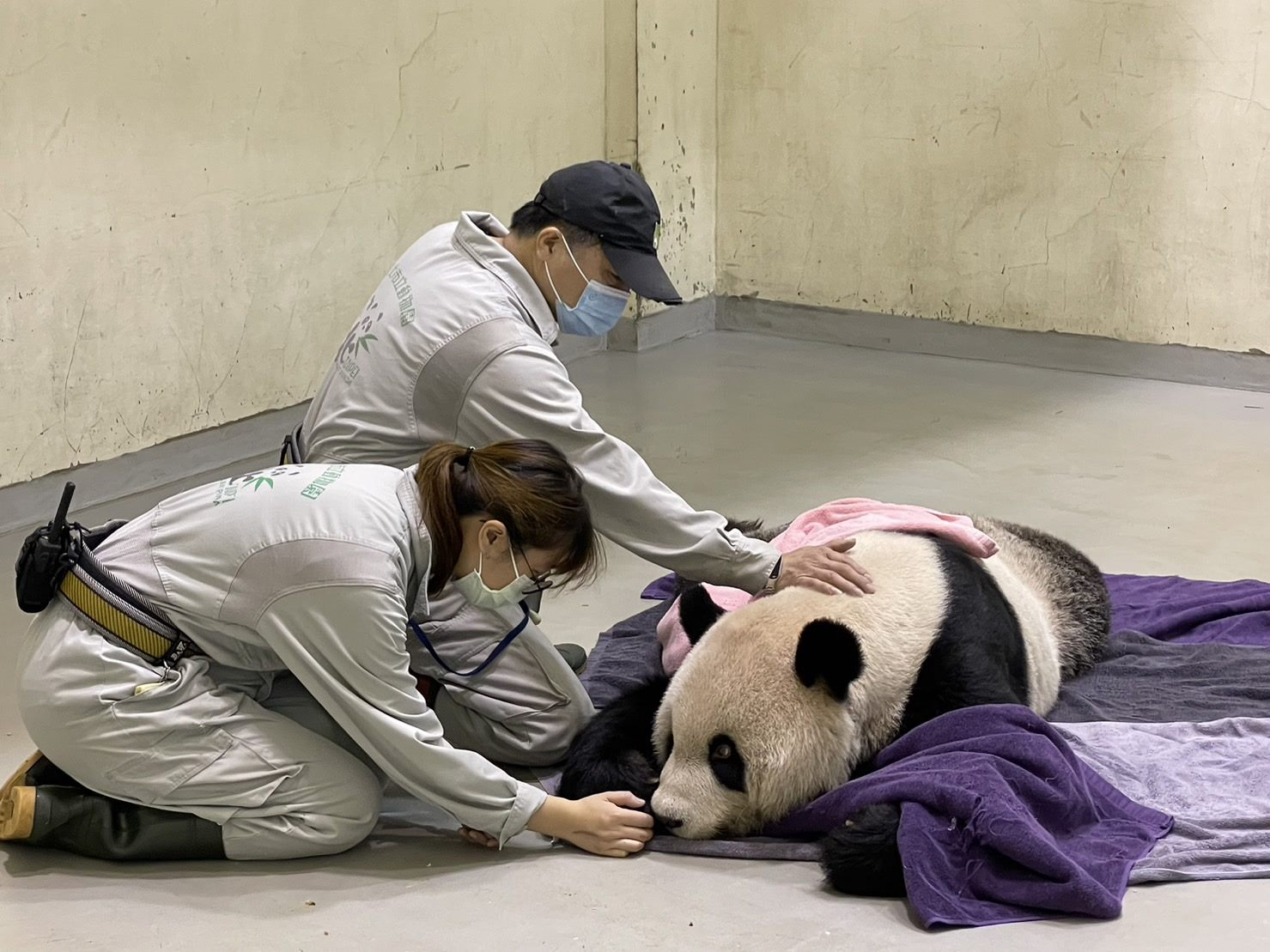
Last photograph of Tuan Tuan (right), taken on the day of his euthanization, November 19, 2022

In October 2022, it was reported that one of the pandas, Tuan Tuan, was suffering from a serious health condition in his brain. In response, the ROC government (under DPP control since 2016) sought help and invited veterinary experts from mainland China to assess Tuan Tuan's situation as he moved into end-of-life care. Tuan Tuan was euthanized on November 19, 2022, after suffering multiple seizures brought on by lesions on his brain.

== Offspring ==
Yuan Yuan gave birth to a cub on July 6, 2013, at Taipei Zoo. The female cub was nicknamed Yuan Zai (also pronounced in Taiwanese Hokkien as Inn-a). Yuan Zai has several meanings: rice ball, and also '(Yuan) Yuan's child'. On October 26, at the zoo's 99th anniversary ceremony, the cub was officially named Yuan Zai after a naming activity that saw 60% of the votes go to the cub's nickname. She was also presented an honorary citizen's card on that day. As Tuan Tuan and Yuan Yuan were sent to Taiwan in exchange for two Formosan sika deer and two Taiwan serows, the cub does not need to be returned. On 28 June 2020, another female cub, which was named Yuan Bao, was born at Taipei Zoo.

== See also ==
- Panda diplomacy – Offer of pandas to Taiwan
- List of individual giant pandas
- List of individual bears
