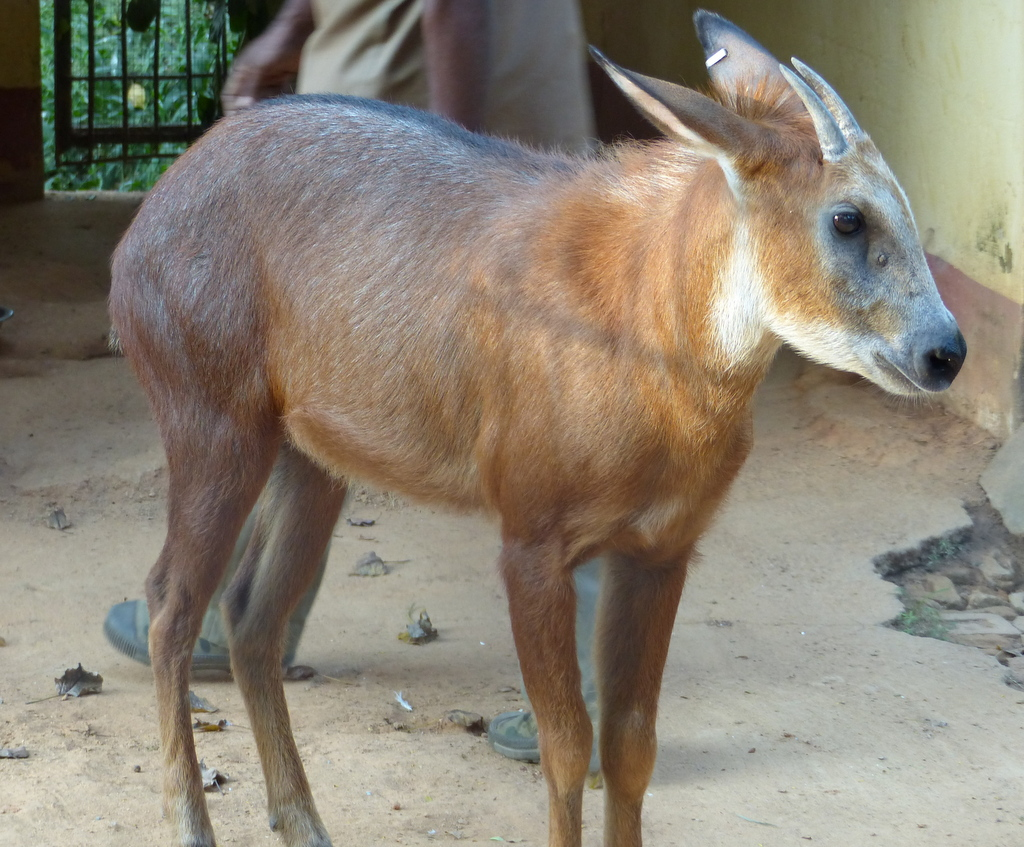

Conservation status
- Vulnerable (IUCN 3.1)
- CITES Appendix I

Scientific classification
- Kingdom: Animalia
- Phylum: Chordata
- Class: Mammalia
- Order: Artiodactyla
- Family: Bovidae
- Subfamily: Caprinae
- Genus: Capricornis
- Species: C. rubidus

Binomial name
- Capricornis rubidus (Blyth, 1863)
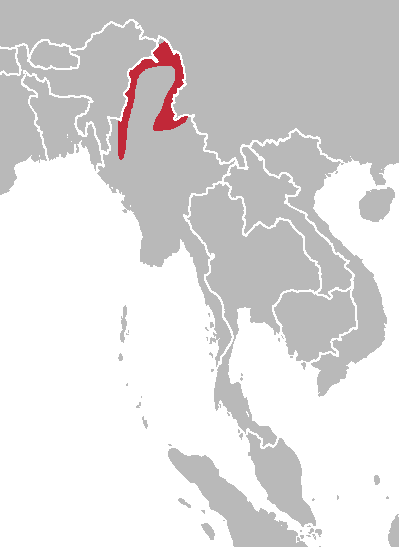
- Distribution of red serow

Synonyms
- Naemorhedus rubidus; Capricornis sumatraensis rubidus

= Red serow =

Species of mammal

The red serow (Capricornis rubidus), also called the Burmese red serow, is a goat-antelope thought to be native to southern Bangladesh and northern Myanmar. It sometimes has been considered a subspecies of C. sumatraensis. In the northeastern part of India, the red serow occurs widely in the hills south of the Brahmaputra river. although the IUCN states that this species is recorded with certainty only from Myanmar, in Kachin State, and that records in India refer to the Himalayan serow. Serow in South and Southeast Asia are threatened by habitat destruction, poaching, and disease transmission from domestic livestock. Myanmar and India face severe poaching issues despite legal protections.

In December 2023, a red serow was found in Sunamganj District of Sylhet Forest Division in north-eastern Bangladesh.
