= Yuan Zai (giant panda) =

Giant panda at the Taipei Zoo (born 2013)

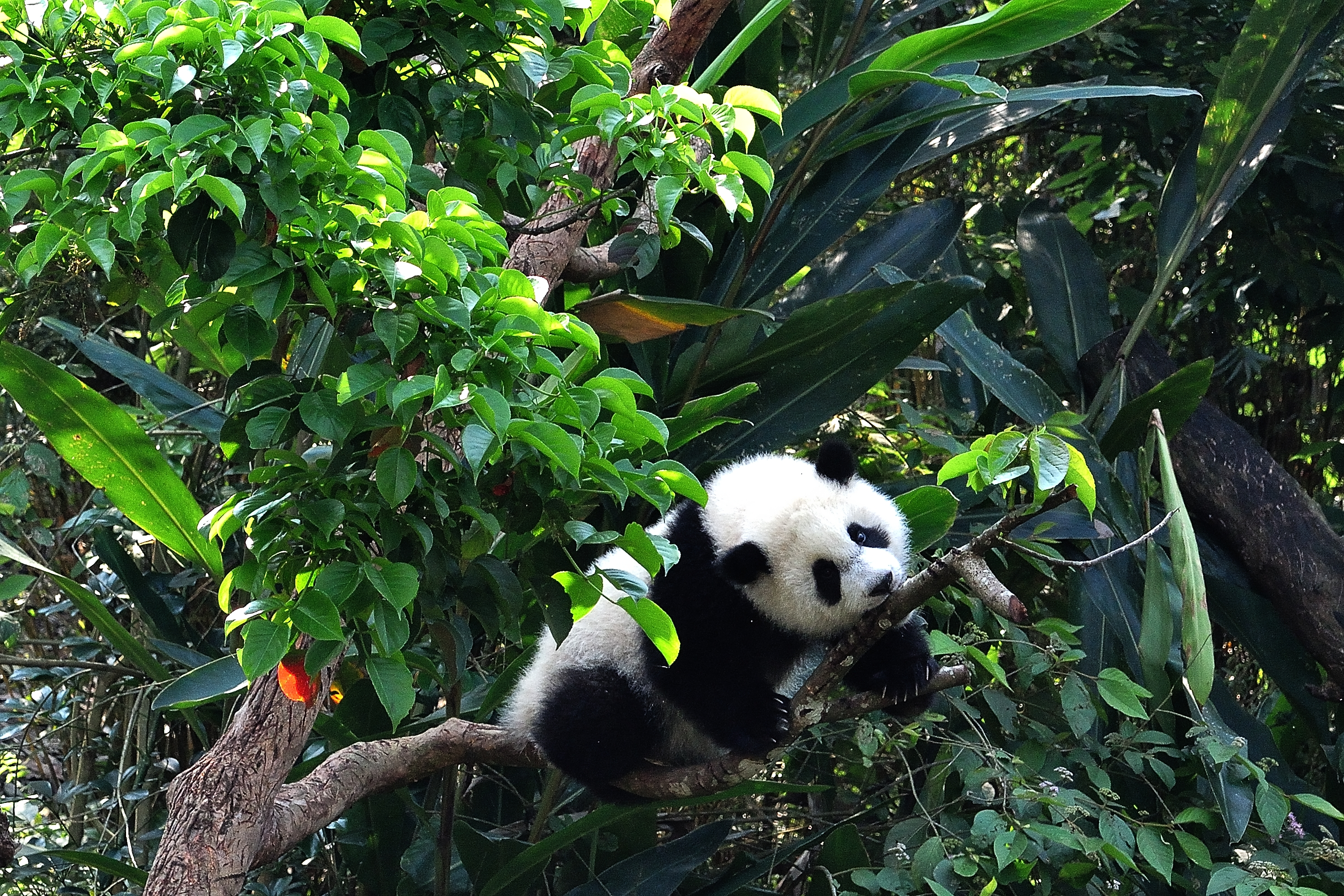
- Yuan Zai in April 2014 on a branch
- Species: Giant panda
- Sex: Female
- Born: July 6, 2013 (age 13); Taipei Zoo, Wenshan District, Taipei, Taiwan
- Parent: Tuan Tuan and Yuan Yuan

Yuan Zai (Chinese: 圓仔; pinyin: Yuánzǎi; Pe̍h-ōe-jī: Îⁿ-á; born 6 July 2013) is a female giant panda born at the Taipei Zoo.

== Life ==
Yuan Zai was born on 6 July 2013 to parents Tuan Tuan and Yuan Yuan by artificial insemination, making her the first giant panda born in Taiwan. As Tuan Tuan and Yuan Yuan were sent to Taiwan from People's Republic of China in exchange for two Formosan sika deer and two Taiwan serows, Yuan Zai does not need to be returned.

The female baby was first nicknamed "Yuan Zai" by the zookeepers soon after birth. At the zoo's 99th anniversary ceremony on 26 October, the baby panda was officially named Yuan Zai after a naming activity that saw 60% of the votes go to the cub's nickname. The name "Yuan Zai" can be interpreted variously as "the little round thing", "rice ball", or "(Yuan) Yuan's child". On the same day, she was also presented an honorary citizen's card.

== Media and public attention ==
Yuan Zai was separated from her mother Yuan Yuan for her first month due to an inadvertent injury inflicted upon her by the first time mother. The two were reunited on 13 August 2013.

On January 6, 2014, Yuan Zai made her public debut at the giant panda house located in the zoo.

== See also ==
- List of individual giant pandas
- List of individual bears
