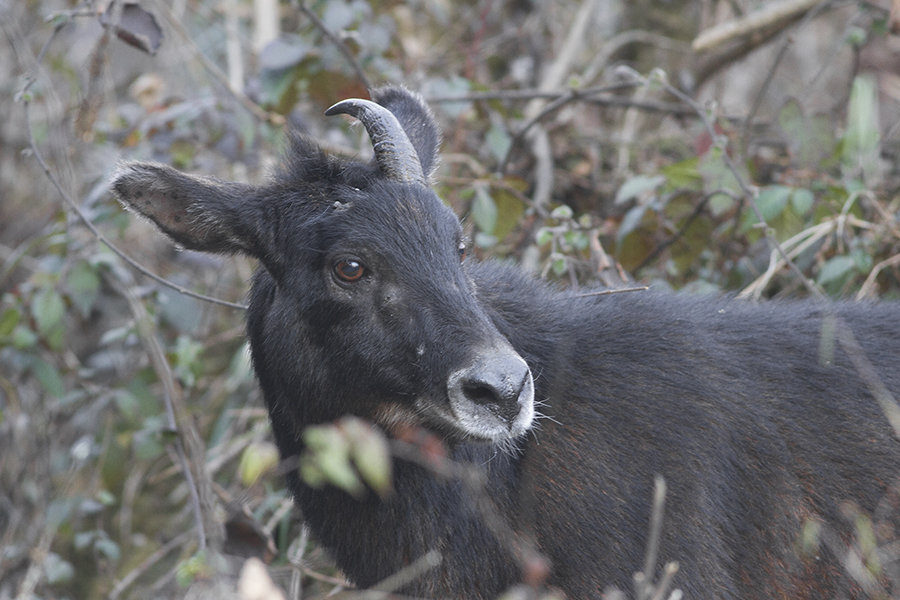
- Male Himalayan serow in Pangolakha Wildlife Sanctuary, Sikkim, India
- CITES Appendix I (CITES)

Scientific classification
- Kingdom: Animalia
- Phylum: Chordata
- Class: Mammalia
- Order: Artiodactyla
- Family: Bovidae
- Subfamily: Caprinae
- Genus: Capricornis
- Species: C. sumatraensis
- Subspecies: C. s. thar

Trinomial name
- Capricornis sumatraensis thar Hodgson, 1831

= Himalayan serow =

Subspecies of goat-like mammal

The Himalayan serow (Capricornis sumatraensis thar), also known as the thar (Note: This name has also by confusion been applied to the tahr.) (/θɑːr/ THAR, /tɑːr/ TAR), is a subspecies of the mainland serow native to the Himalayas. It was previously considered its own species, as Capricornis thar. It is the official state animal of the Indian state of Mizoram.

== Taxonomy ==
In 1831, Brian Houghton Hodgson first described a goat-like animal with short annulated horns occurring in montane regions between the Sutlej and Teesta Rivers under the name "Bubaline Antelope". As "Bubaline" was preoccupied, he gave it the scientific name Antelope thar a few months later. When William Ogilby described the genus Capricornis in 1838, he determined the Himalayan serow as type species of this genus.

== Description ==
The Himalayan serow is mostly blackish, with flanks, hindquarters, and upper legs that are a rusty red; its lower legs are whitish.

== Distribution and habitat ==
The Himalayan serow inhabits hilly forests above an elevation of 300 m (980 ft), but descends to 100 m (330 ft) in winter. It prefers elevations of 2,500–3,500 m (8,200–11,500 ft) in the Himalayas.

== Conservation ==
Capricornis sumatraensis is listed in CITES Appendix I.
