= Taipei Zoo =

Zoo in Taiwan

Taipei Zoo 臺北市立動物園
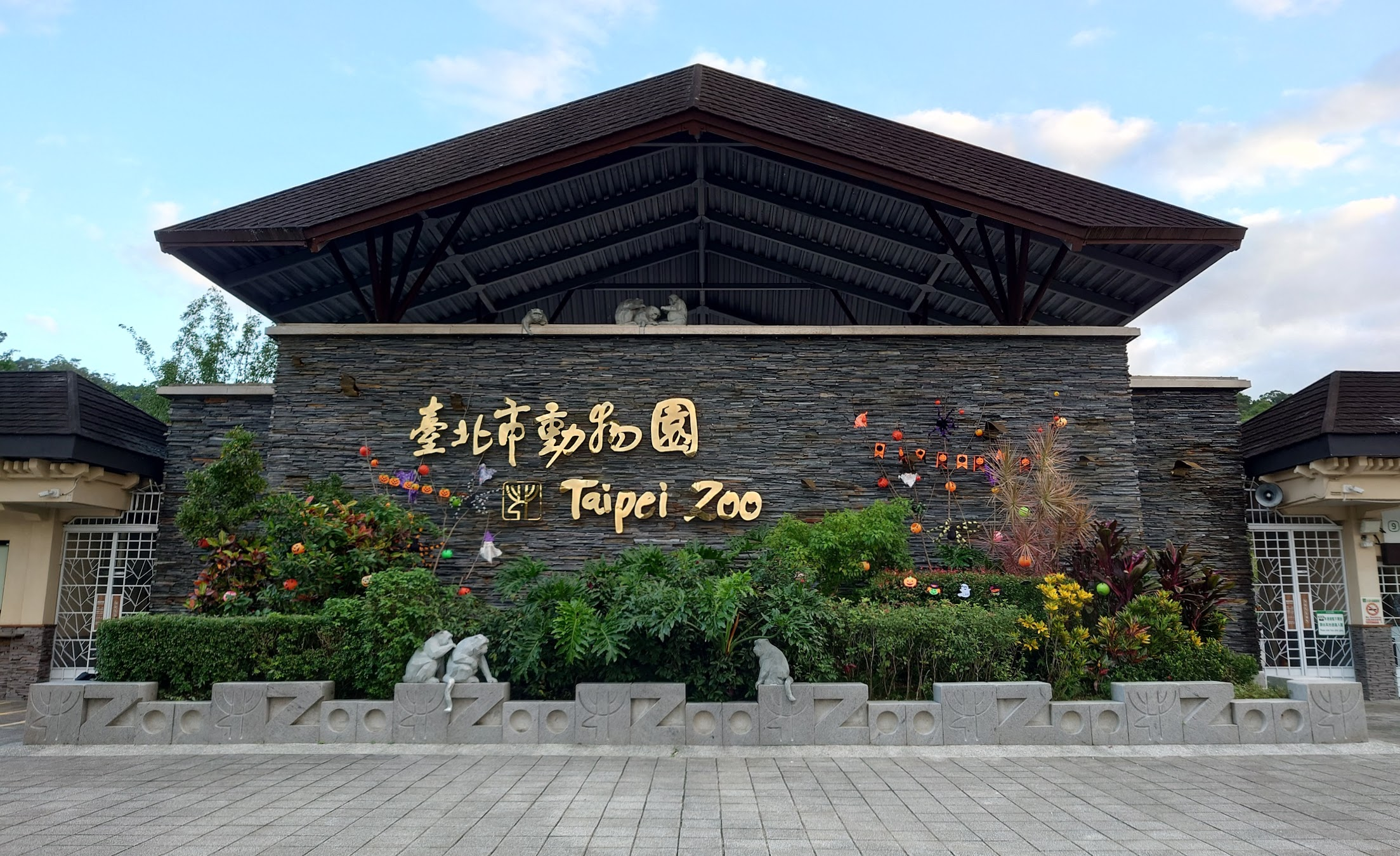
- Entrance of the zoo
- Interactive map of Taipei Zoo 臺北市立動物園
- 24°59′42″N 121°35′3″E
- Date opened: 1914
- Location: Wenshan, Taipei, Taiwan
- Land area: 165 hectares
- No. of animals: 2407
- No. of species: 354
- Memberships: WAZA: EAZA; SEAZA; TAZA (Taiwan Aquarium and Zoological Park Association)
- Major exhibits: Giant Panda House, Pangolin dome
- Owner: Department of Education, Taipei City Government
- Management: South East Asian Zoos Association
- Public transit: MRT Taipei Zoo station (Wenhu line); Maokong Gondola (Taipei Zoo station, Taipei Zoo South station)
- Website: https://english.zoo.gov.taipei/

Taipei Zoo
- Traditional Chinese: 臺北市立動物園
- Simplified Chinese: 台北市立动物园
Transcriptions
Standard Mandarin
- Hanyu Pinyin: Táiběi Shìlì Dòngwùyuán
- Bopomofo: ㄊㄞ´ ㄅㄟˇ ㄕ` ㄌㄧ` ㄉㄨㄥ` ㄨ` ㄩㄢ´
- Wade–Giles: T'ai pei shih li tung wu yüan
- Yale Romanization: TaiBeiShr Li DungWuYwan
other Mandarin
- Xiao'erjing: ﺗَﻰْ ﺑُﻮِٔ شِ لِ دْﻮ ءُ ﻳُﻮًا
Hakka
- Romanization: Thòi-pet-sṳ li̍p thûng vu̍t yèn
Yue: Cantonese
- Jyutping: toi4 bak1 si5 lap6 dung6 mat6 jyun4
Southern Min
- Hokkien POJ: Tâi-pak-chhī li̍p tōng bu̍t hn̂g

Muzha Zoo
- Traditional Chinese: 木柵動物園
- Simplified Chinese: 木栅动物园
Transcriptions
Standard Mandarin
- Hanyu Pinyin: Mù zhà dòngwùyuán

The Taipei Zoo, sometimes referred to as the Muzha Zoo, is a public zoological garden in Wenshan District, Taipei, Taiwan. It is the most famous zoological garden in Taiwan and a leader in conservation, research and education, and recreation. It is one of the largest zoos in Asia, with a total area of 165 hectares, of which more than 90 ha are developed.

== History ==
The Taipei Zoo was founded as Maruyama Zoo (Japanese: 圓山動物園, Hepburn: Maruyama Dōbutsuen) in 1914, when Taiwan was under Japanese rule, in Mt. Maruyama (modern-day Yuanshan) on the northern suburb of Taihoku (modern-day Taipei). It was originally a private zoological garden owned by a Japanese citizen, Mr. Oe. The Japanese government in Taiwan bought the property the following year and opened it as a public park. After World War II, the Republic of China (ROC) retreated to Taiwan and the ownership of the park was passed to the Taipei City Government of ROC. An Asian elephant named Lin Wang that served with the Chinese Expeditionary Force during the Second Sino-Japanese War (1937–1945) and later relocated to Taiwan with the Kuomintang forces was moved to the zoo, and lived out most of his life and was the most popular animal at the zoo, and the most famous animal in Taiwan until it received 2 pandas from China. Many adults and children alike affectionately called the bull elephant "Grandpa Lin Wang". Due to a need for expansion and for better conditions for the animals, the zoo was moved to its current site in Muzha on the southeastern suburb of Taipei City in 1986. It is, therefore, sometimes referred to as the "Muzha Zoo" to be distinguished from the former "Yuan-shan Zoo". The current site encloses 165 hectares, including 90 hectares open to the public.

The zoo was badly hit during Typhoon Soudelor on 8 August 2015 which caused NT$10 million of loss with additional NT$4 million in reparation cost. The zoo opened again on 11 August 2015 while some parts of it were still kept closed.

The zoo was awarded the Japanese Foreign Minister’s Commendation for their contributions to promotion of mutual understanding between Japan and Taiwan on December 1, 2020.

== Exhibitions ==
=== Formosan Animal Area ===
Located near the zoo entrance, this area features animals indigenous to Taiwan, such as clouded leopards, Eurasian otters, Formosan black bears, Formosan rock macaques, Formosan sika deer, leopard cats, Taiwan serows, Taiwanese pangolins and wild boar.

=== Children's Zoo ===
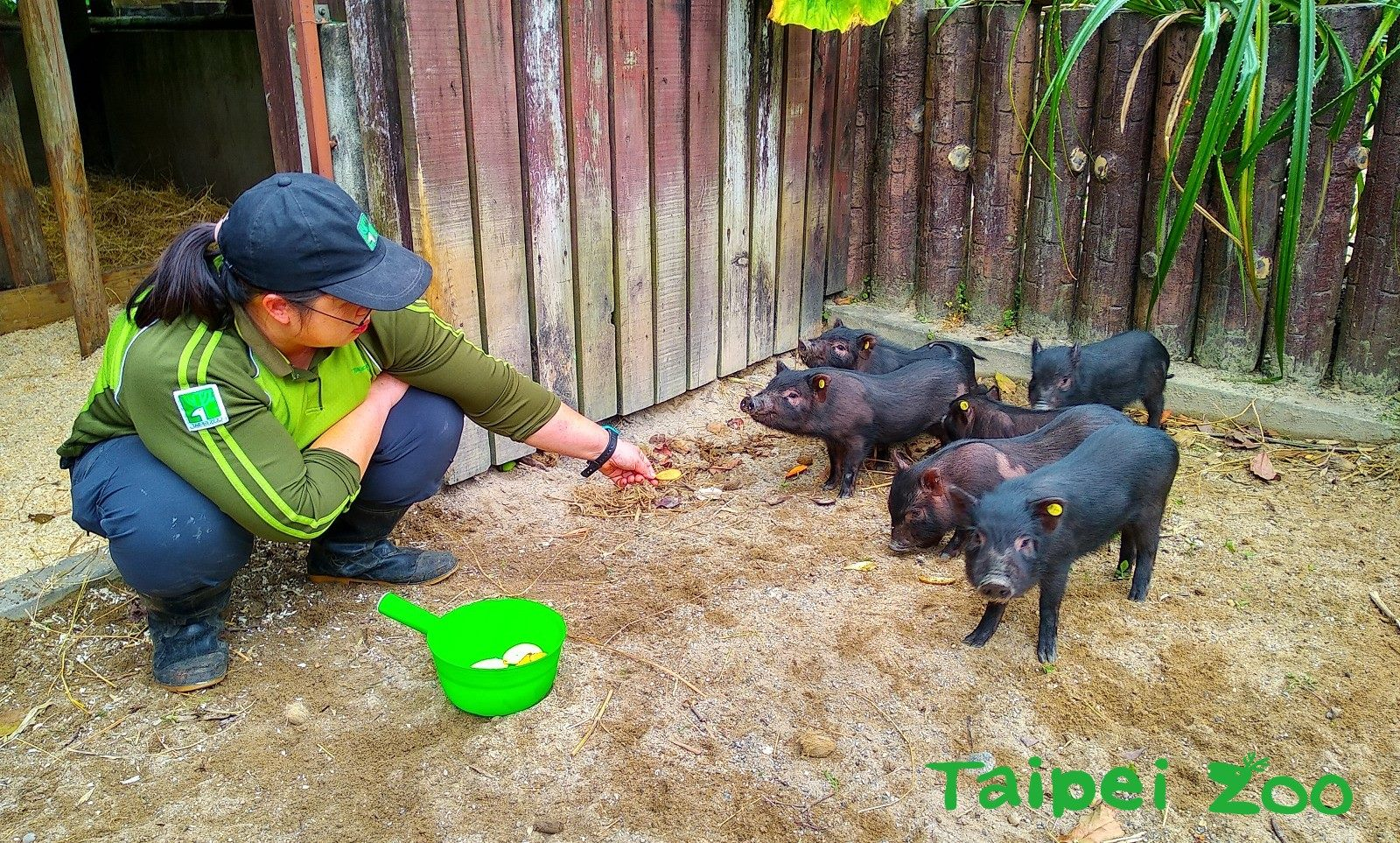
Zookeeper feeding Lanyu piglets

Young guests can interact with domestic animals, such as alpacas, chickens, donkeys, rabbits and pigs. The Children's Zoo also has habitats for some wild animals, including meerkats, raccoons and South American coatis.

=== Insectarium ===
A statue of a stag beetle stands at the entrance of the zoo's insectarium, which contains many species of insects and arachnids. Behind the Insectarium is a butterfly garden housing more than 125 species of butterfly.

=== Tropical Rainforest Area ===
Animals from the rainforests of Southeast Asia are featured here, including Asian elephants, Asian small-clawed otters, Bengal tigers, Bornean orangutans, great hornbills, leopards, Malayan tapirs and siamangs, alongside a few South American animals, including black-capped squirrel monkeys, capybaras and giant anteaters.

==== Pangolin Dome ====
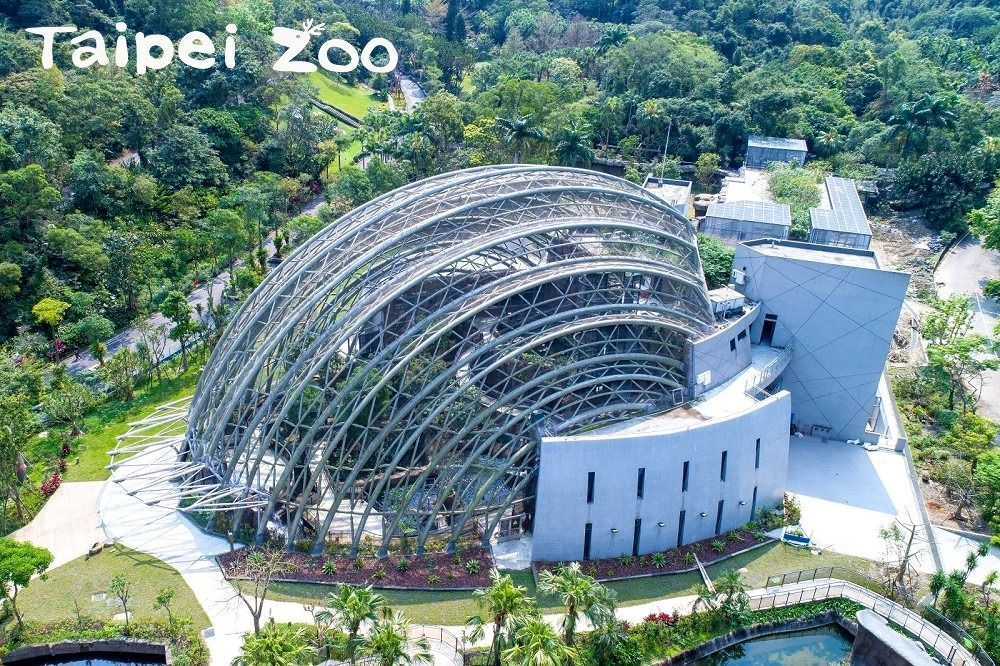
front side

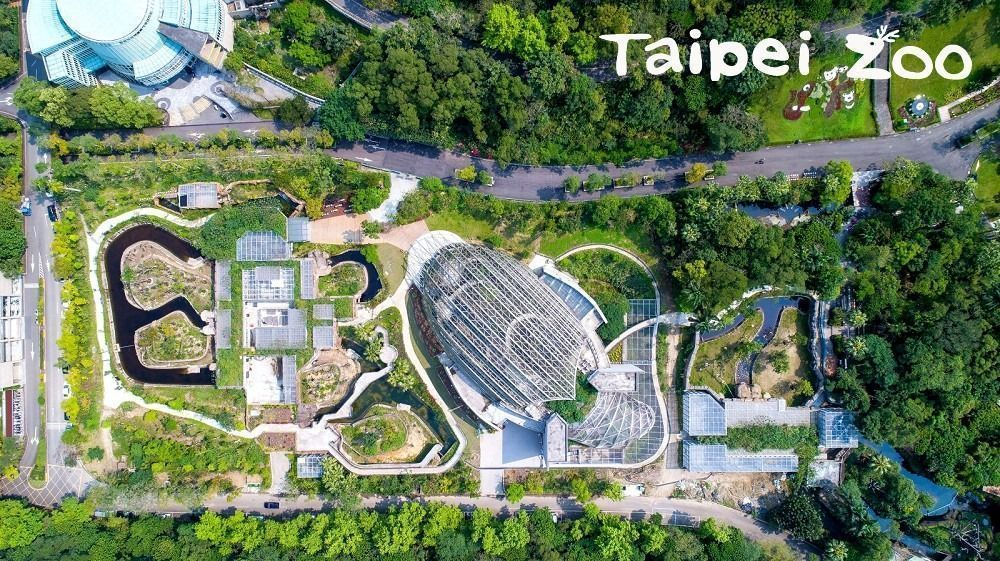
Top view

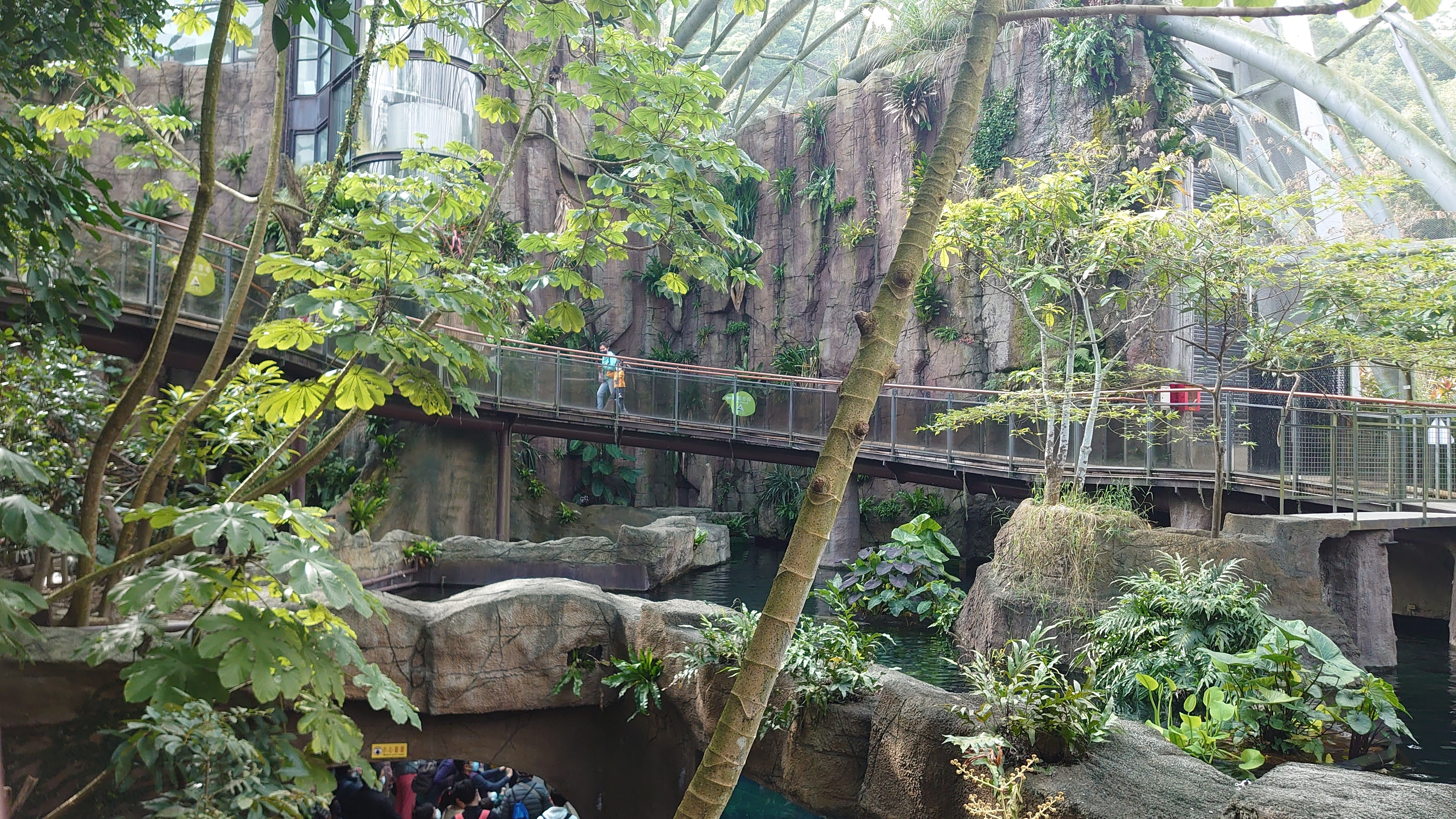
Interior

The Pangolin Dome is a pavilion which was completed in 2019 at a cost of NT$390 million. Its design was inspired by the shape of a pangolin and is intended to raise public awareness about wildlife trafficking in general and more specifically the pangolin trade. The pavilion sits on 1.5 hectares, is 24 meters tall, and comprises six outdoor exhibits and one indoor. The large dome-shaped indoor exhibit is used to display several tropical rainforest species. A female aye-aye arrived from the Ueno Zoo in 2019.

=== Giant Panda House ===
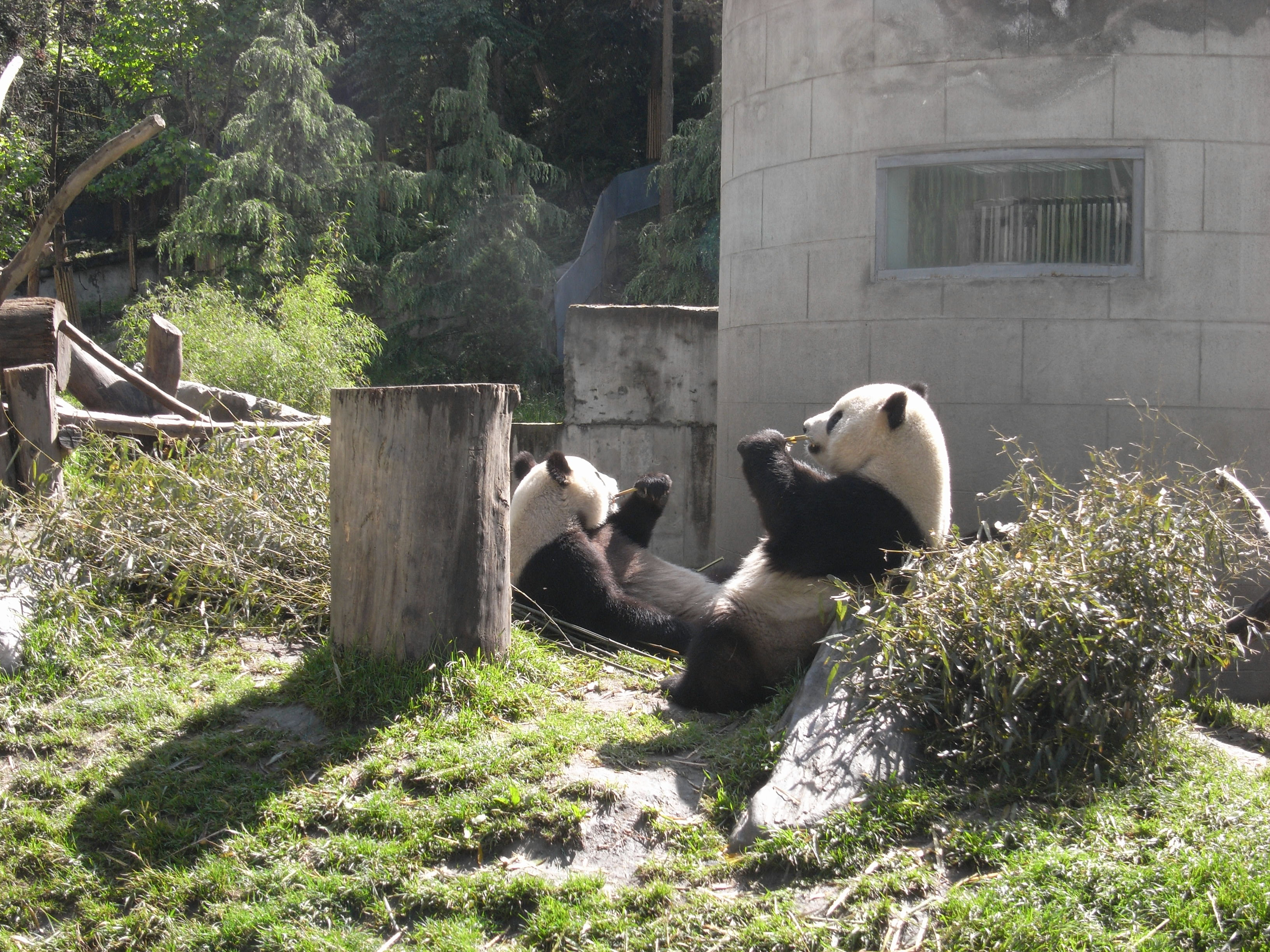
Tuan Tuan at the Taipei Zoo

In 2008, the zoo received two pandas from the People's Republic of China (PRC), named Tuan Tuan and Yuan Yuan (meaning "reunion"), as a gesture of unity. The gift of the endangered pandas had been rejected by President Chen Shui-bian in 2005 who viewed it as a propaganda tool against Taiwan's independence, but the next president, Ma Ying-jeou, of the Kuomintang, had forged stronger economic and diplomatic relations with the PRC under his presidency, and was willing to accept them. The offering of pandas as a gift from the PRC is often known as "panda diplomacy", and the zoo expected to draw around 30,000 visitors a day as a result of their arrival. The move was criticized by supporters of Taiwan's independence and the opposition Democratic Progressive Party, who said that "Tuan Tuan and Yuan Yuan means a union, which perfectly matches Beijing's goal of bringing Taiwan into its fold."

The offspring of Tuan Tuan and Yuan Yuan, Yuan Zai, was born on July 6, 2013. She is the first panda cub to be born in Taiwan. Yuan Zai's public debut was on January 6, 2014.

=== Desert Animal Area ===
This sub-section of the zoo contains addaxes, African wild asses and Bactrian camels.

=== Australian Animal Area ===
A pair of koalas arrived from the Currumbin Wildlife Sanctuary in 1999 and koalas have been prominently kept on display ever since. Additionally, eastern grey kangaroos, emus and southern cassowaries are also displayed here.

=== African Animal Zone ===
The exhibit simulates the East African savanna and covers 6 hectares of land for several large animals. These include African bush elephants, Chapman's zebras, gemsbok, wildebeest, common elands, giraffes, bongos, hippos, lions, spotted hyenas, olive baboons, lemurs, pygmy hippos, western lowland gorillas and white rhinos.

=== Bird World ===
More than 130 species of bird are on display, including black-faced spoonbills, cockatoos, eagles, flamingos, parrots, pelicans, pheasants, pigeons, red-crowned cranes, scarlet ibises and other waterfowl.

=== Amphibian and Reptile House ===
The Amphibian and Reptile House has a wavy ceiling, meant to resemble the movement of snakes. Over 90 species of reptiles and amphibians are housed here, including Aldabra giant tortoises, ball pythons, eastern blue-tongued skinks, green tree pythons, Indian star tortoises, Taipei tree frogs and many more.

=== Temperate Zone Animal Area ===
Multiple temperate species are on display here, these include American bison, brown bears, gray wolves, Przewalski's horses, pumas, red pandas and false gharials. The zoo's penguin house is also located nearby, including two species of penguin, African penguins and king penguins.

== Transportation ==
Metro
Taipei Zoo station

- :BR01
- :Y01

Gondola
Taipei Zoo station
Taipei Zoo South station

The zoo is accessible from Taipei Zoo Station of the Taipei Metro.

== Gallery ==
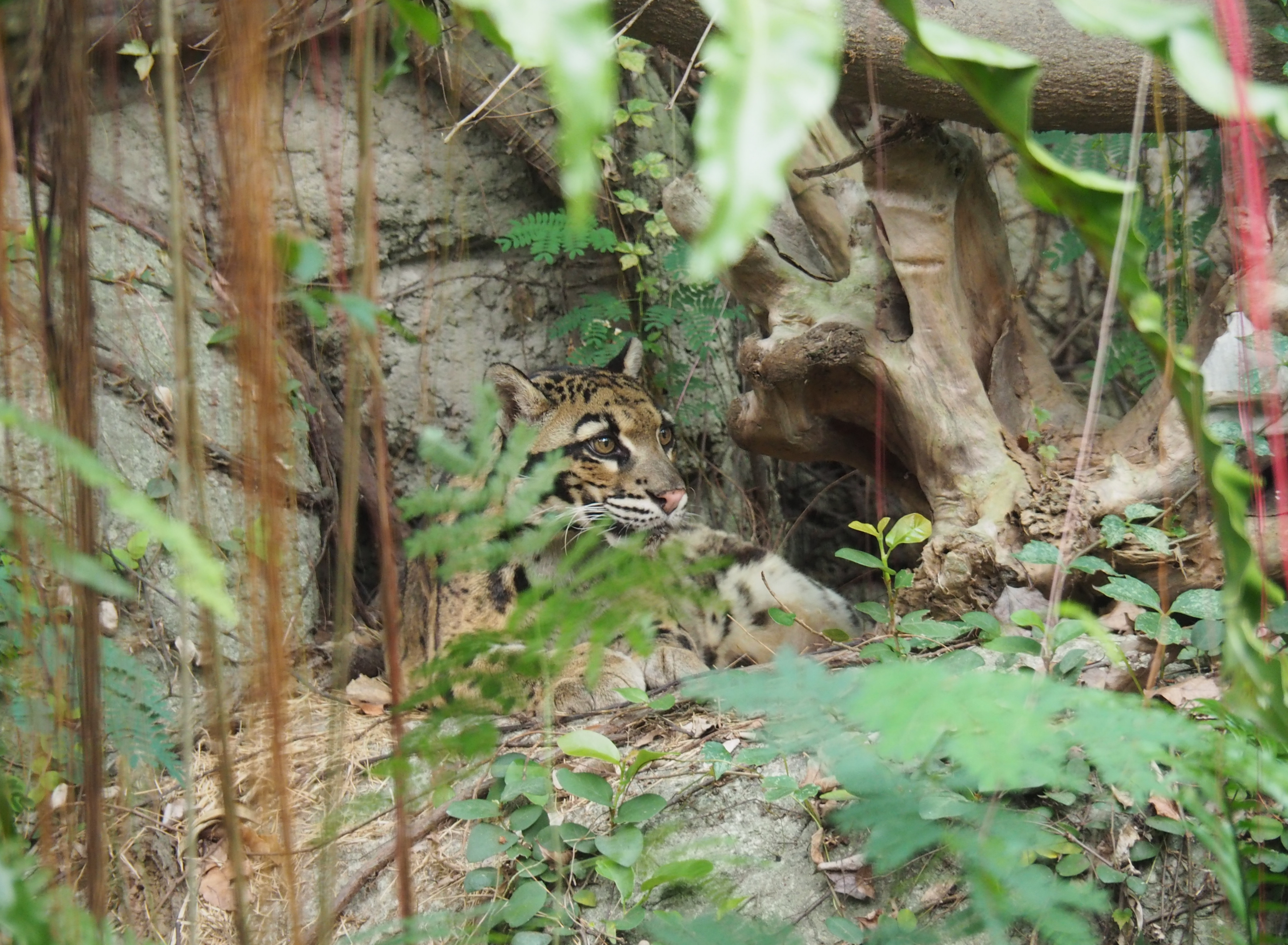
Clouded leopard

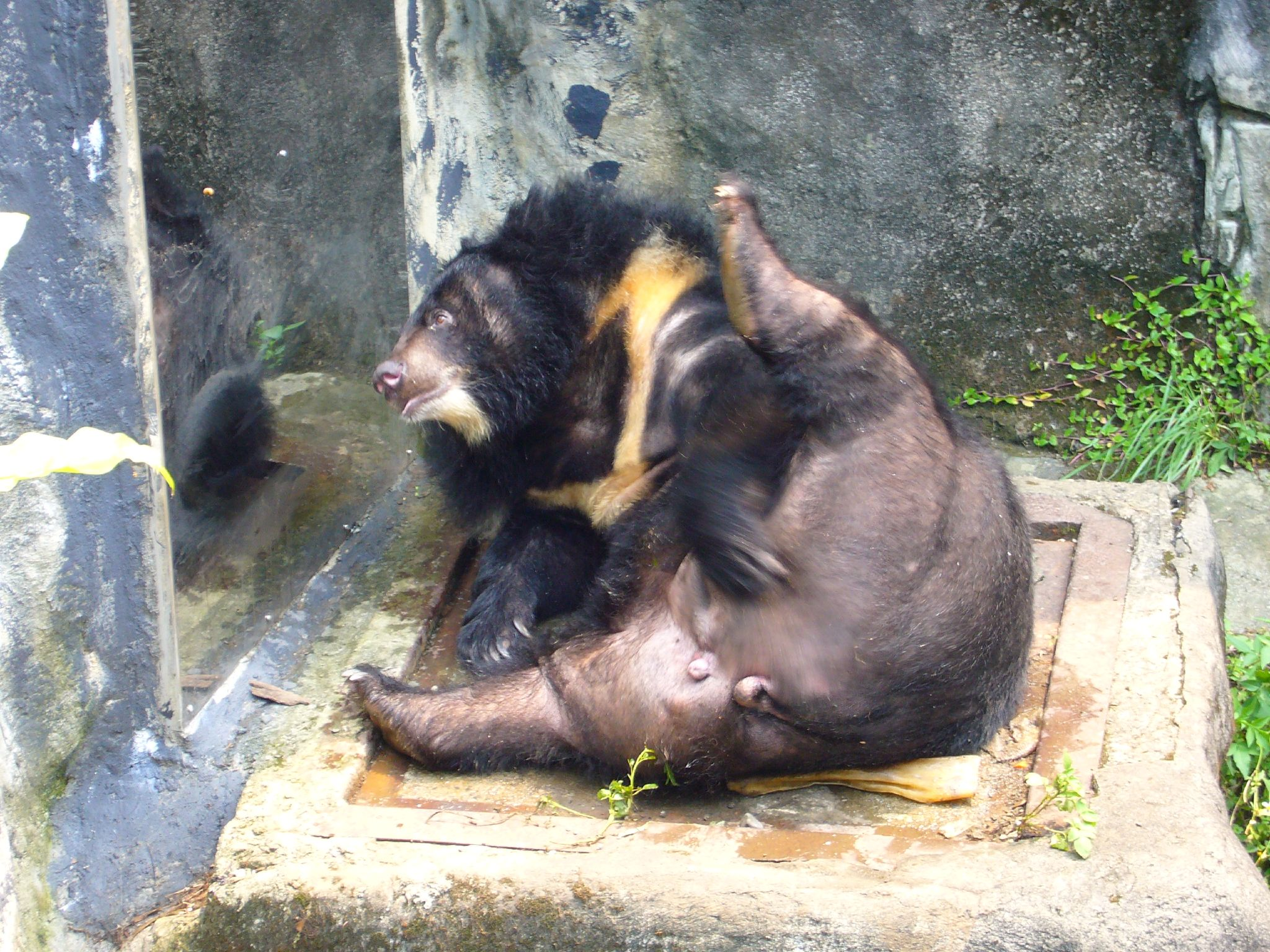
Formosan black bear

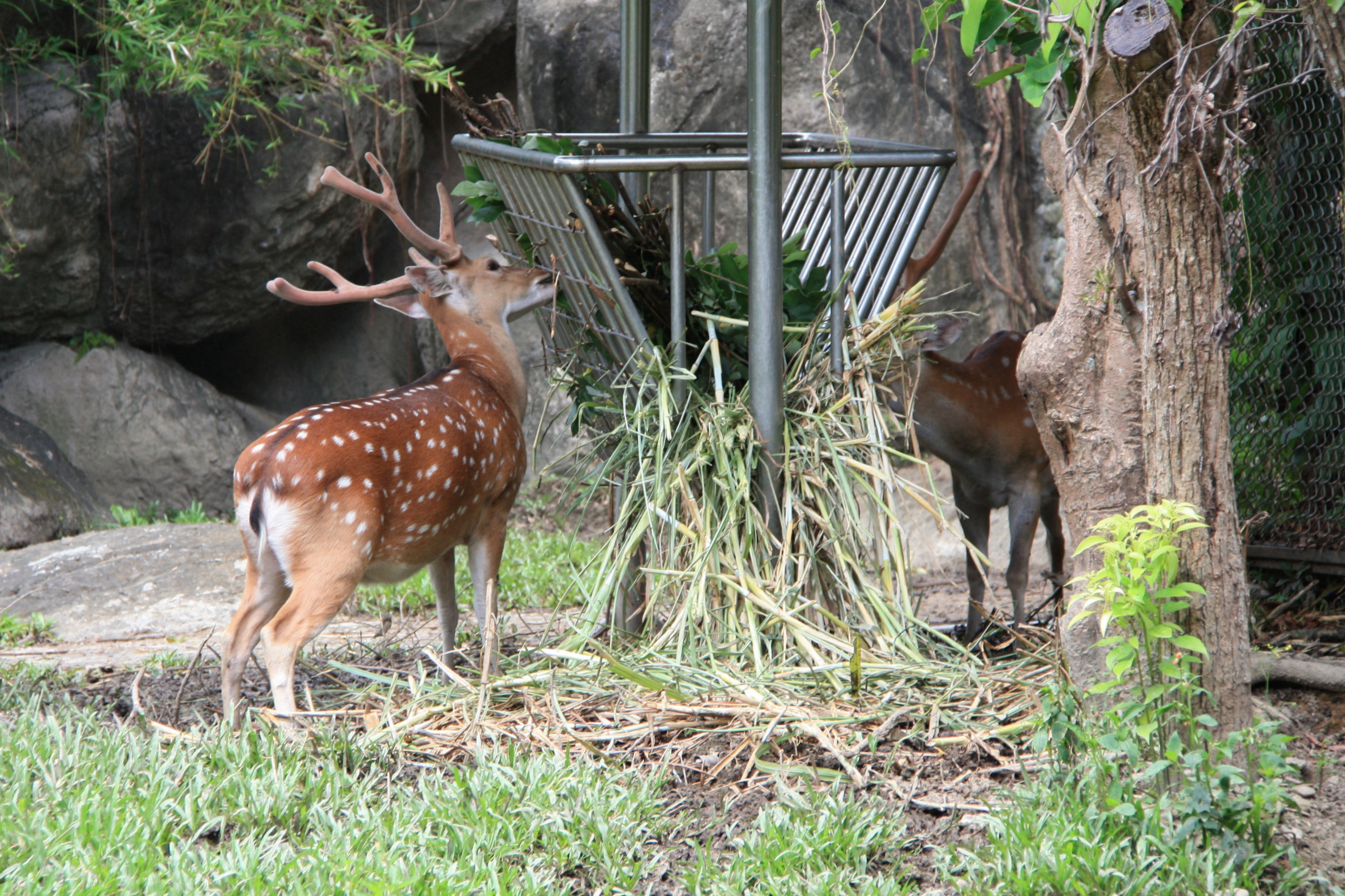
Formosan sika deer

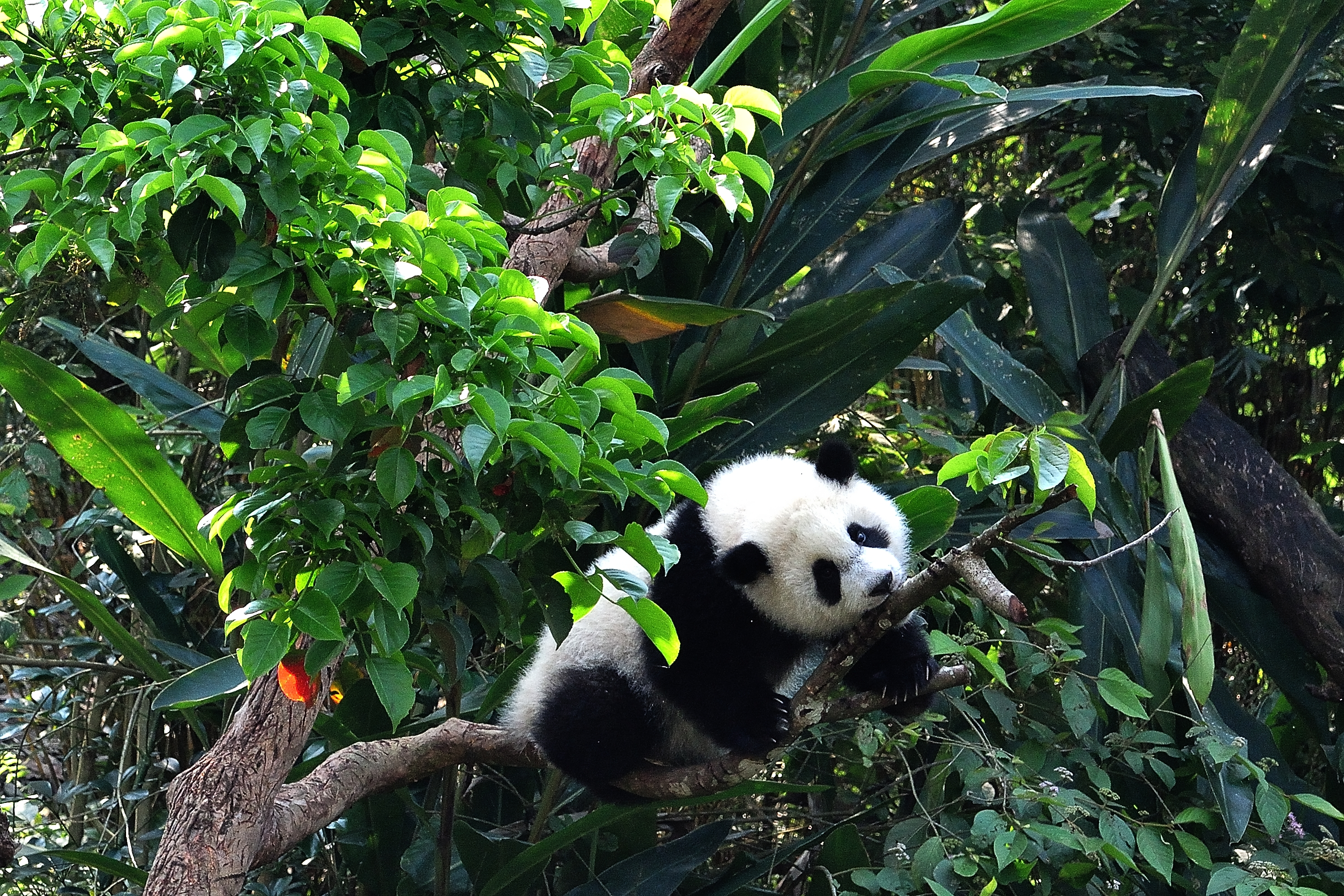
Giant Panda

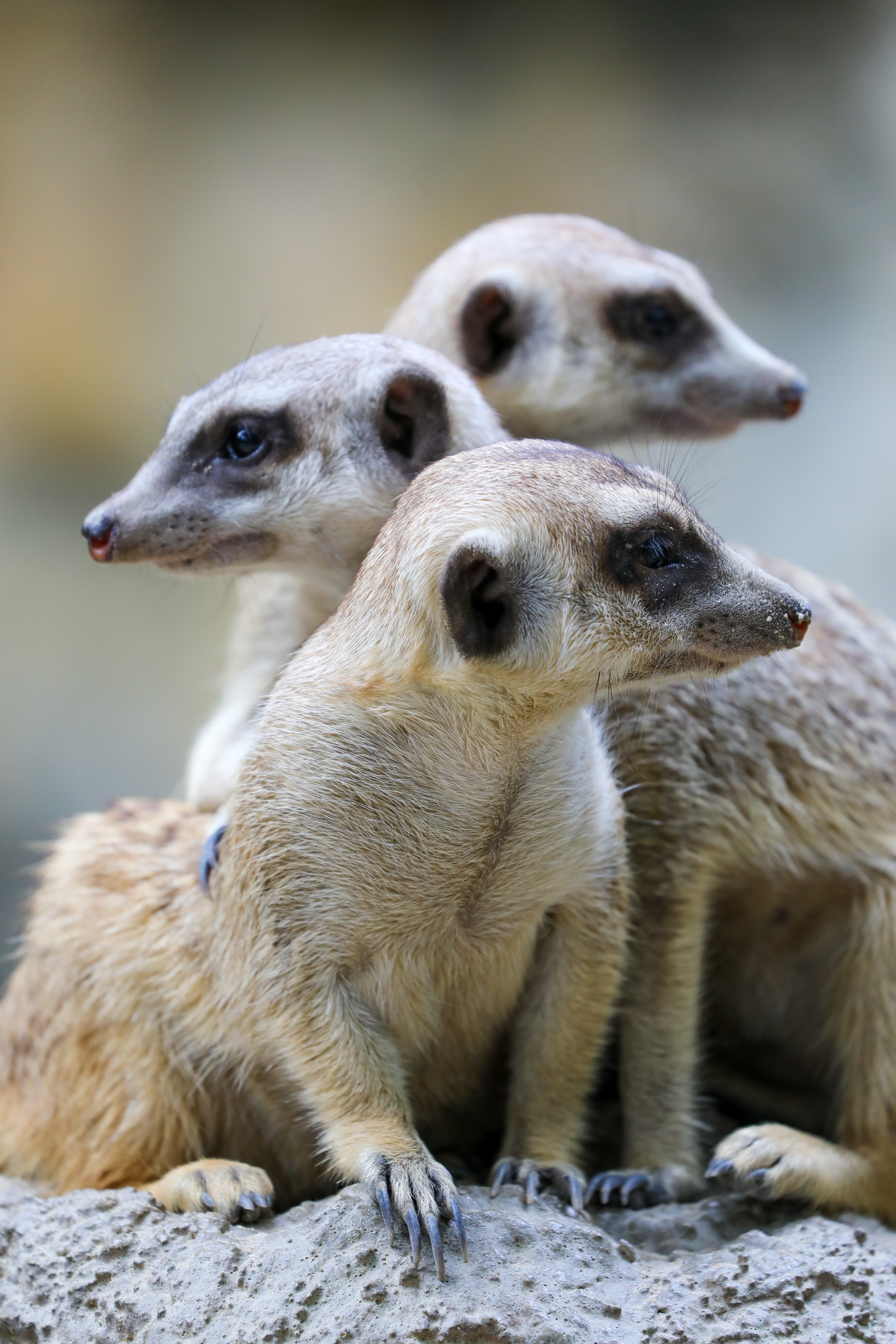
Meerkats

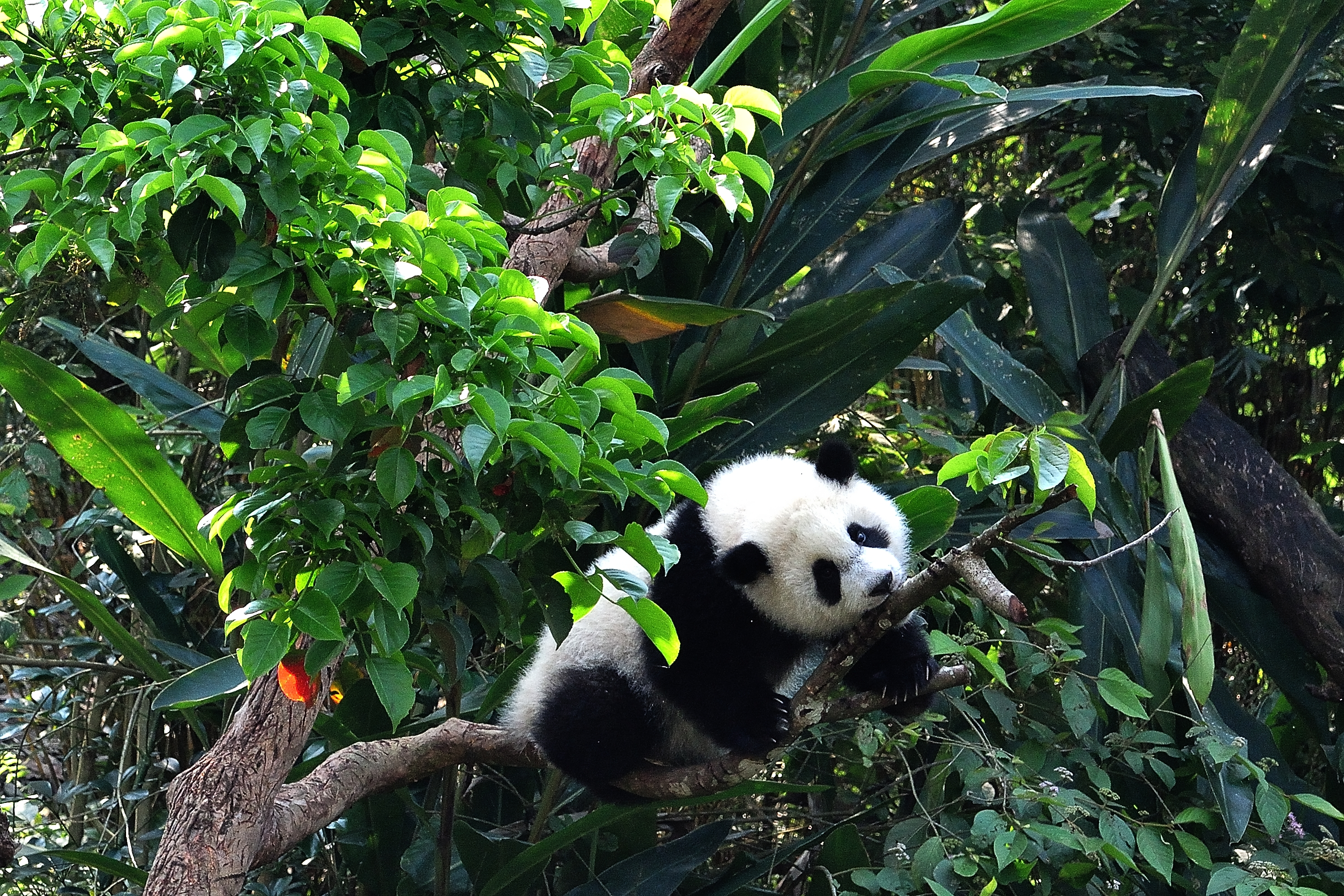
Yuan Zai the panda cub

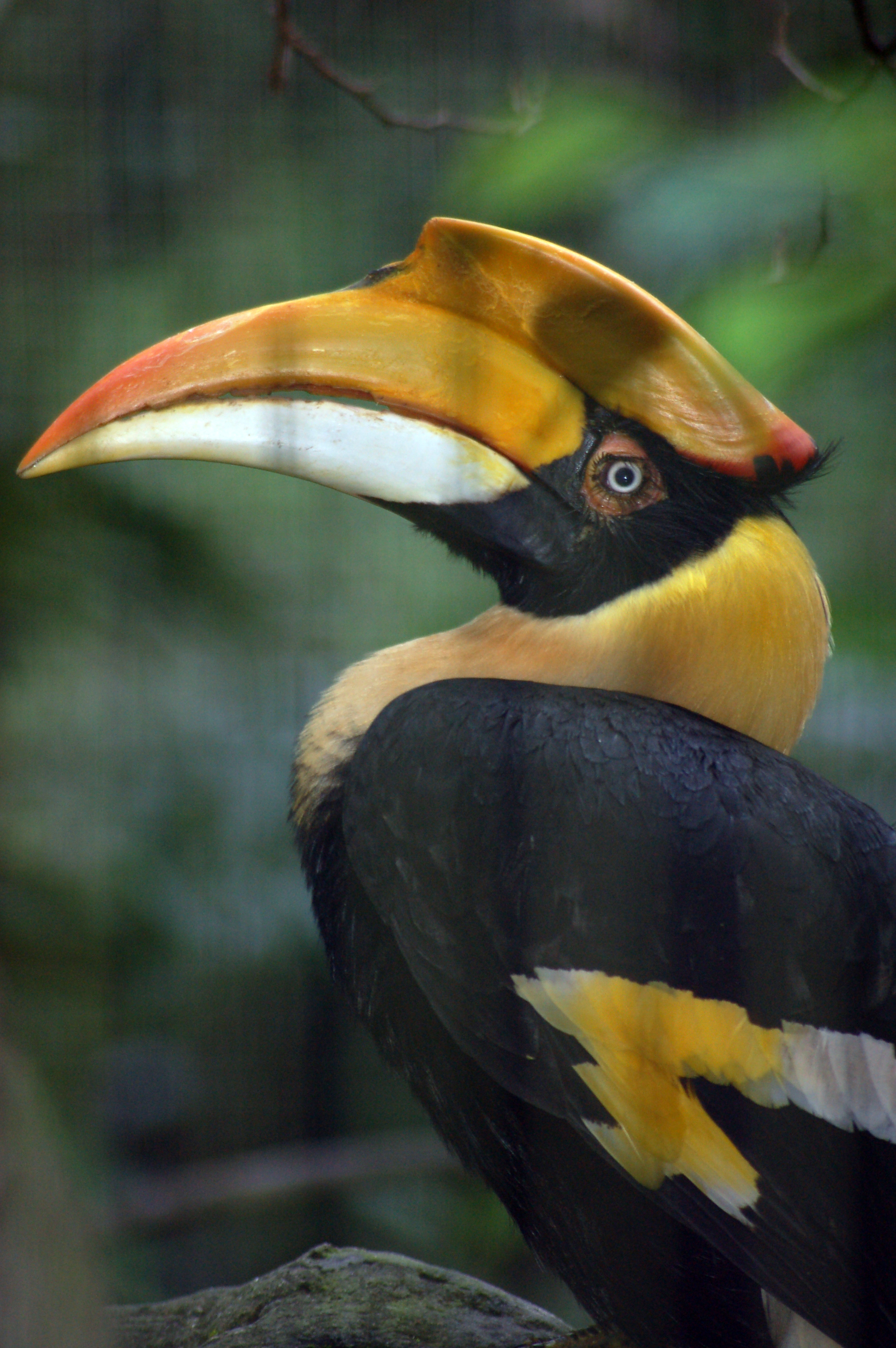
Great hornbill

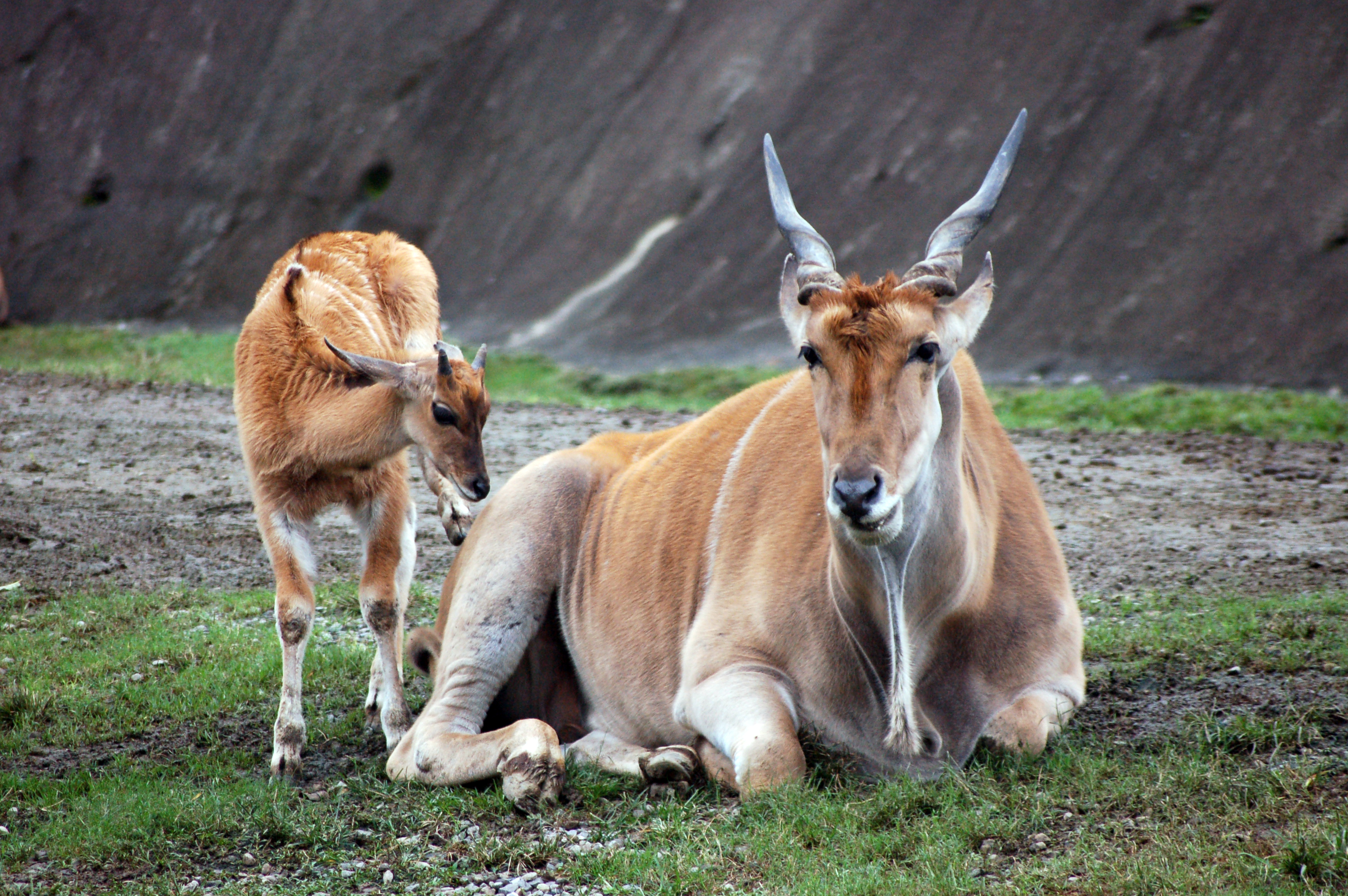
Eland and calf

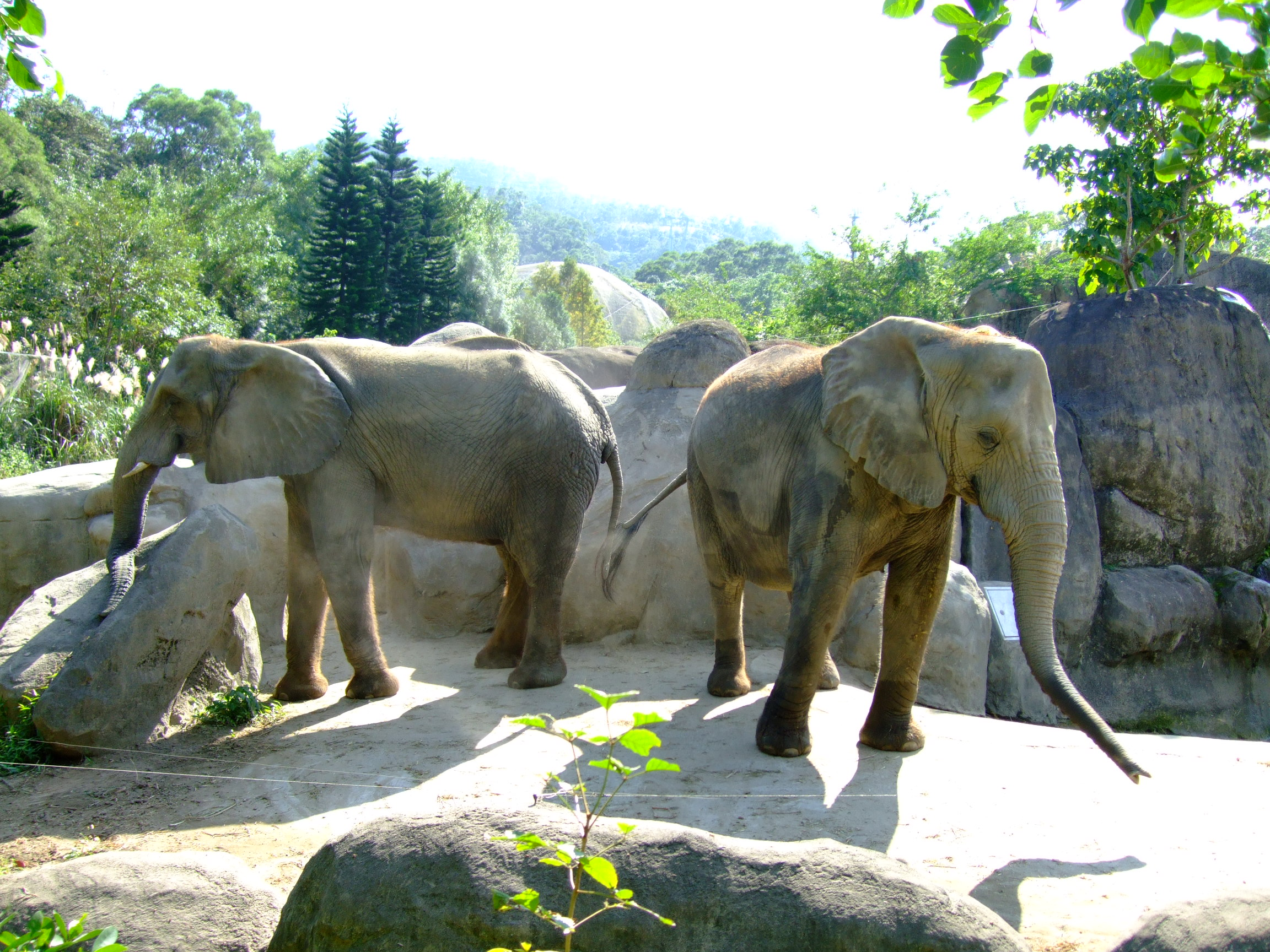
African elephants Chien Hui and Mei Tai

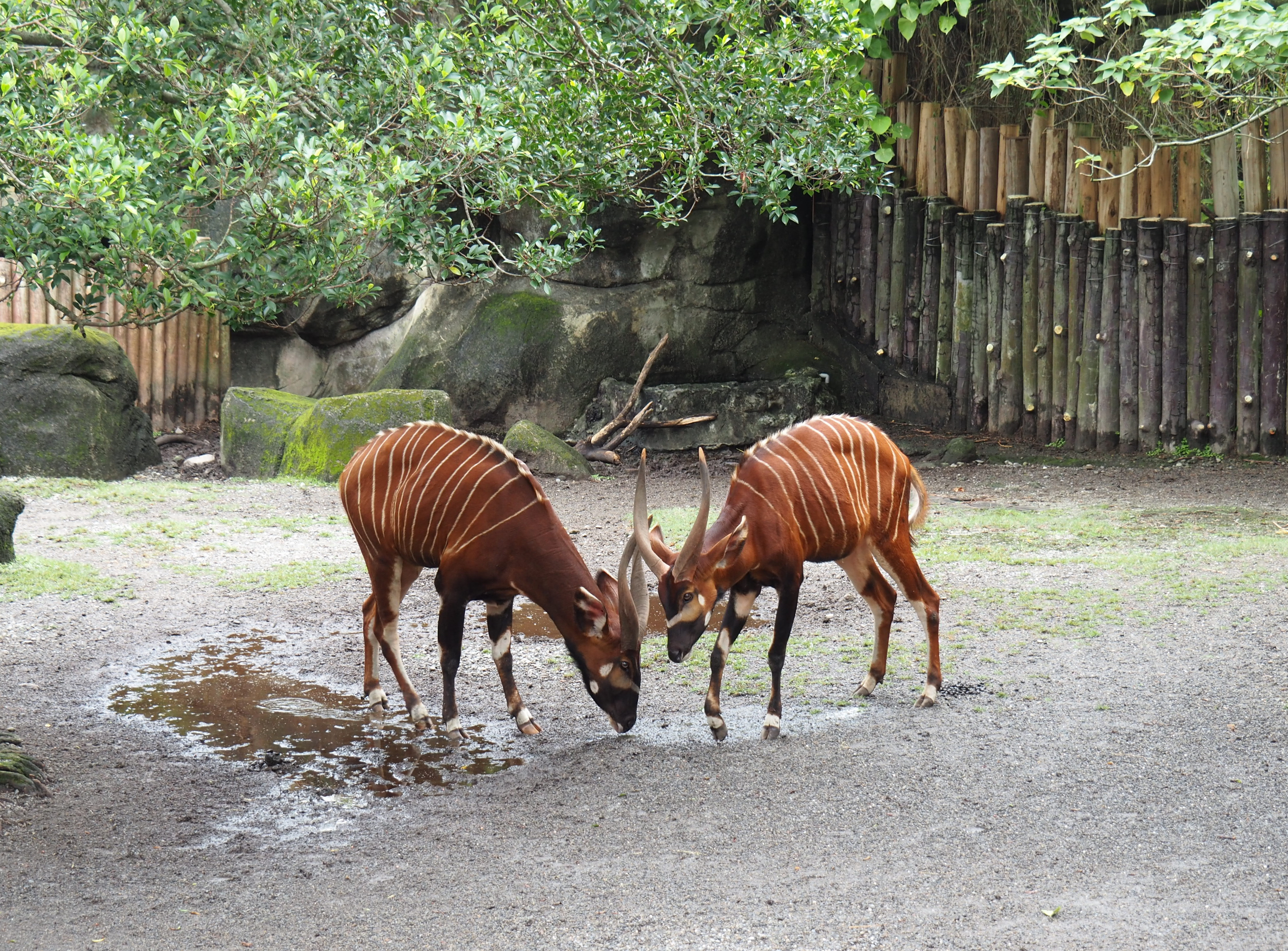
Bongos

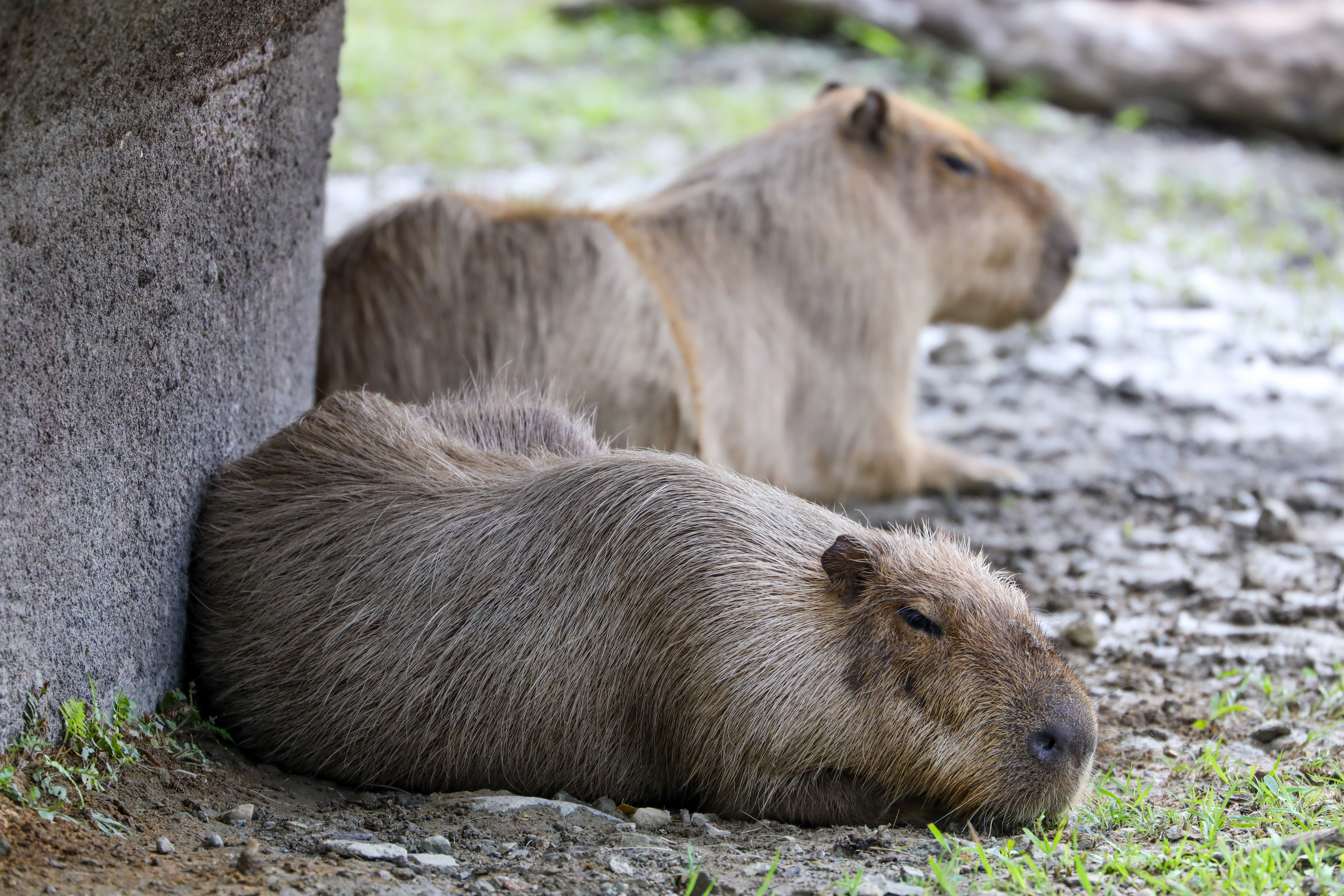
Capybaras

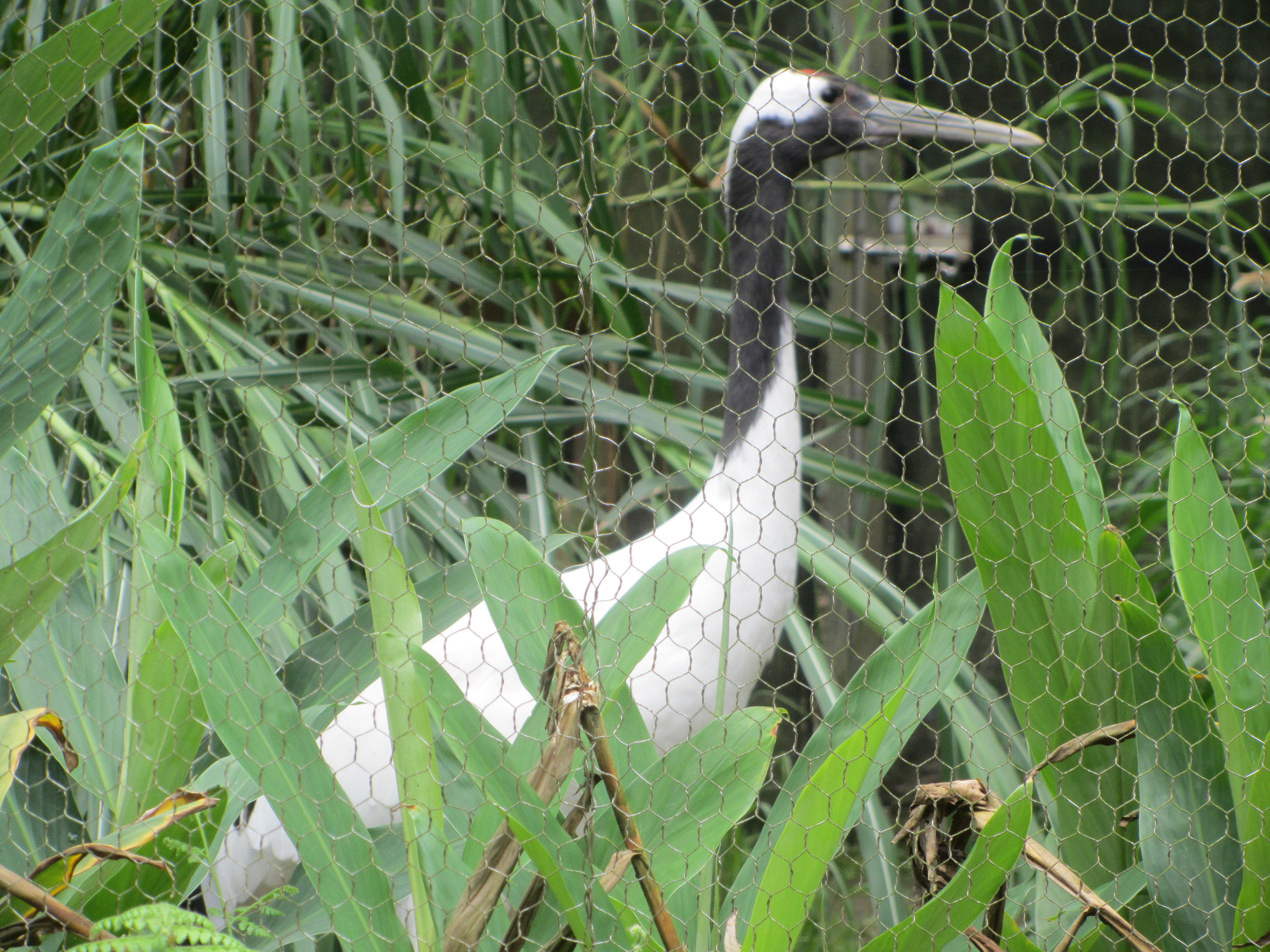
Red-crowned crane

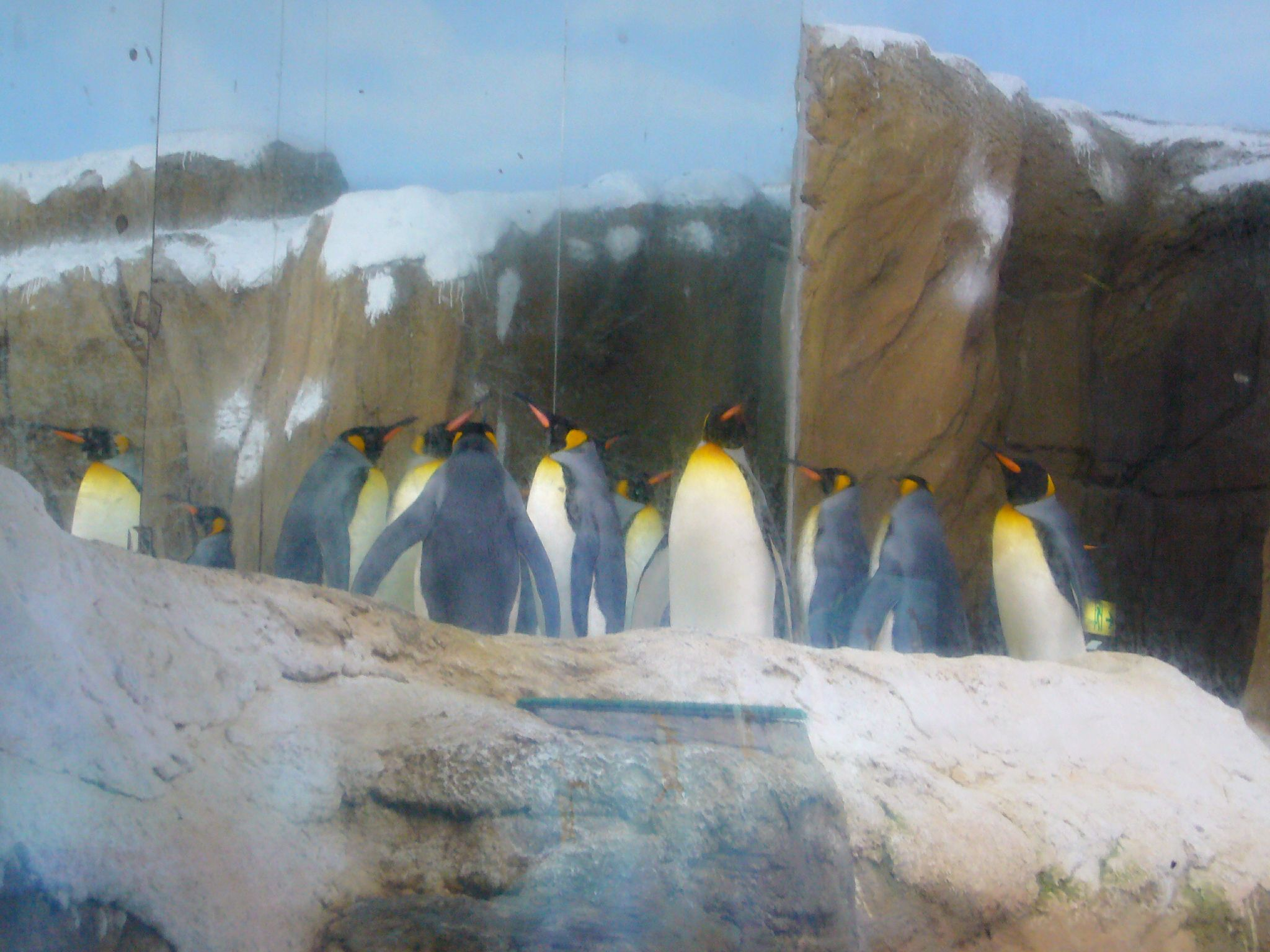
King penguins
