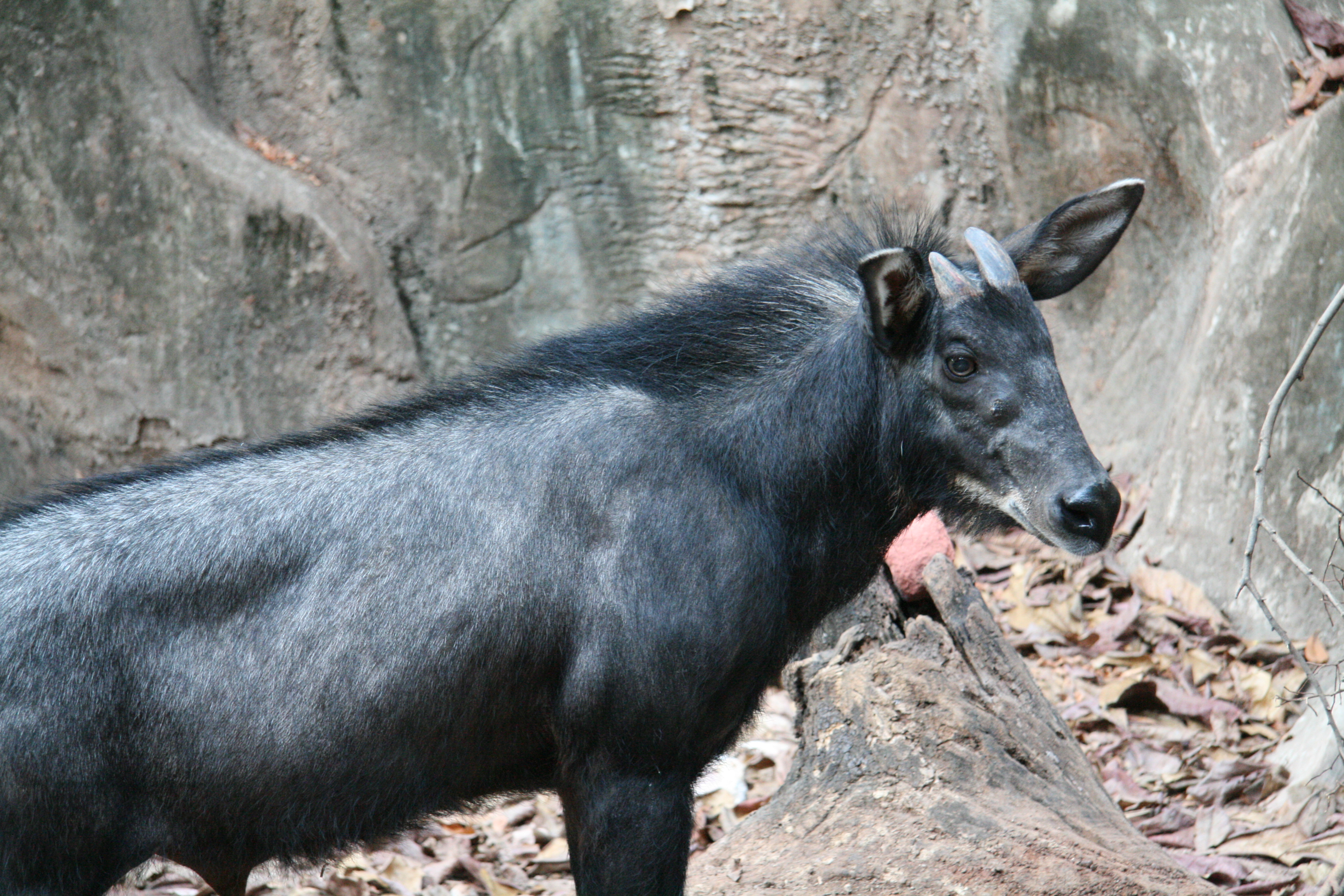
- Mainland serow (Capricornis sumatraensis) at Dusit Zoo, Bangkok, Thailand.

Scientific classification
- Kingdom: Animalia
- Phylum: Chordata
- Class: Mammalia
- Infraclass: Placentalia
- Order: Artiodactyla
- Family: Bovidae
- Subfamily: Caprinae
- Tribe: Ovibovini
- Genus: Capricornis; Ogilby, 1837

Type species
- Antilope thar Hodgson, 1831

Species
- Capricornis crispus Capricornis rubidus Capricornis sumatraensis Capricornis swinhoei

= Serow =

Genus of goat-antelope ('Capricornis')

The serow (/səˈroʊ/, or /ˈsɛroʊ/) is any of four species of medium-sized goat-like or antelope-like mammals in the genus Capricornis in the family Bovidae. All four species of serow were, until recently, classified under Naemorhedus, which now only contains the gorals.

== Extant species ==
This genus has been analyzed, studied, and reclassified a number of times. In 2005, Mammal Species of the World (3rd ed.) listed six different species (C. crispus, C. milneedwardsii, C. rubidus, C. sumatraensis, C. swinhoei, and C. thar), with two subspecies of C. milneedwardsii. The current consensus recognises the following four species, with C. milneedwardsii and C. thar demoted to subspecies of C. sumatraensis:

| Image | Scientific name | Common name | Distribution |
|---|---|---|---|
| | Capricornis crispus | Japanese serow | Honshu, Kyushu, and Shikoku in Japan |
| | Capricornis sumatraensis | Mainland serow | Eastern Himalayas, eastern and southeastern Bangladesh, China, Southeast Asia, and on the Indonesian island of Sumatra |
| | Capricornis rubidus | Red serow | East India, southern Bangladesh and northern Myanmar |
| | Capricornis swinhoei | Taiwan or Formosan serow | Taiwan |

Serows live in south-central, southeast and eastern Asia. Their coloration varies by species, region, and individual. However, the different species are not particularly sexually dimorphic, as both males and females have beards and small horns (which are often shorter than their ears).

Like their smaller relatives, the gorals, serows are often found grazing on rocky and forested hillsides, though typically at a lower elevation in places where the two species' territories overlap; gorals tend to be wary and typically retreat to higher elevations and steeper mountainsides. Serows are slightly larger and slower-moving, and somewhat less agile, than gorals; however, they can still nimbly climb up or down the slopes to escape predation or to find appropriate shelter during cold winters or hot summers. Serows, unlike gorals, make use of their preorbital glands in territorial scent marking.

Fossils of serow-like animals date as far back as the late Pliocene, two to seven million years ago. The common ancestor species of the Caprinae subfamily may have been very similar to modern serows.

The serow subfamily population as a whole is considered endangered. Most serow species are included in the red list of IUCN with decreasing populations. The Japanese serow is better protected than the other sub-species of serows.
