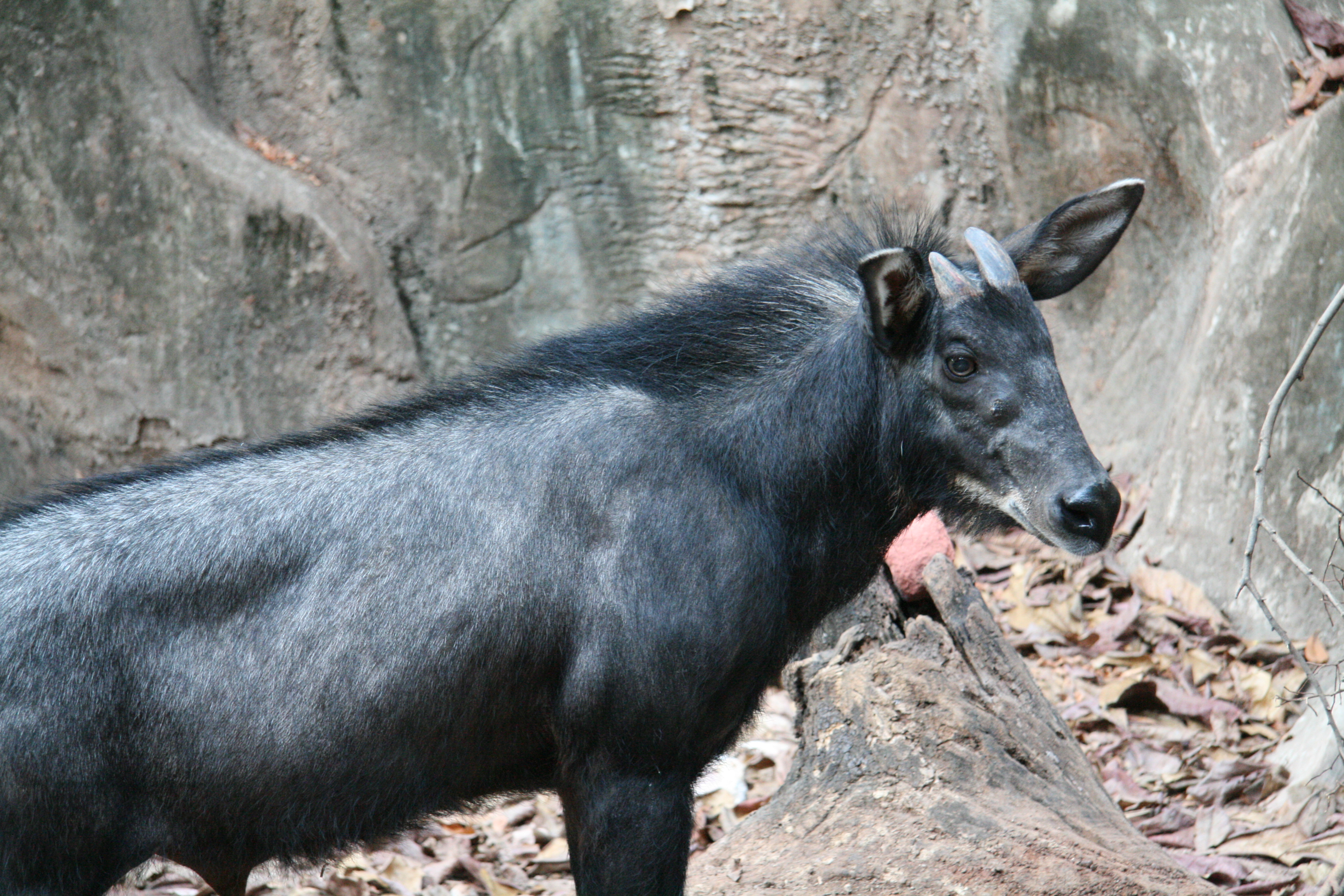

Conservation status
- Vulnerable (IUCN 3.1)
- CITES Appendix I

Scientific classification
- Kingdom: Animalia
- Phylum: Chordata
- Class: Mammalia
- Infraclass: Placentalia
- Order: Artiodactyla
- Family: Bovidae
- Subfamily: Caprinae
- Genus: Capricornis
- Species: C. sumatraensis

Binomial name
- Capricornis sumatraensis (Bechstein, 1799)
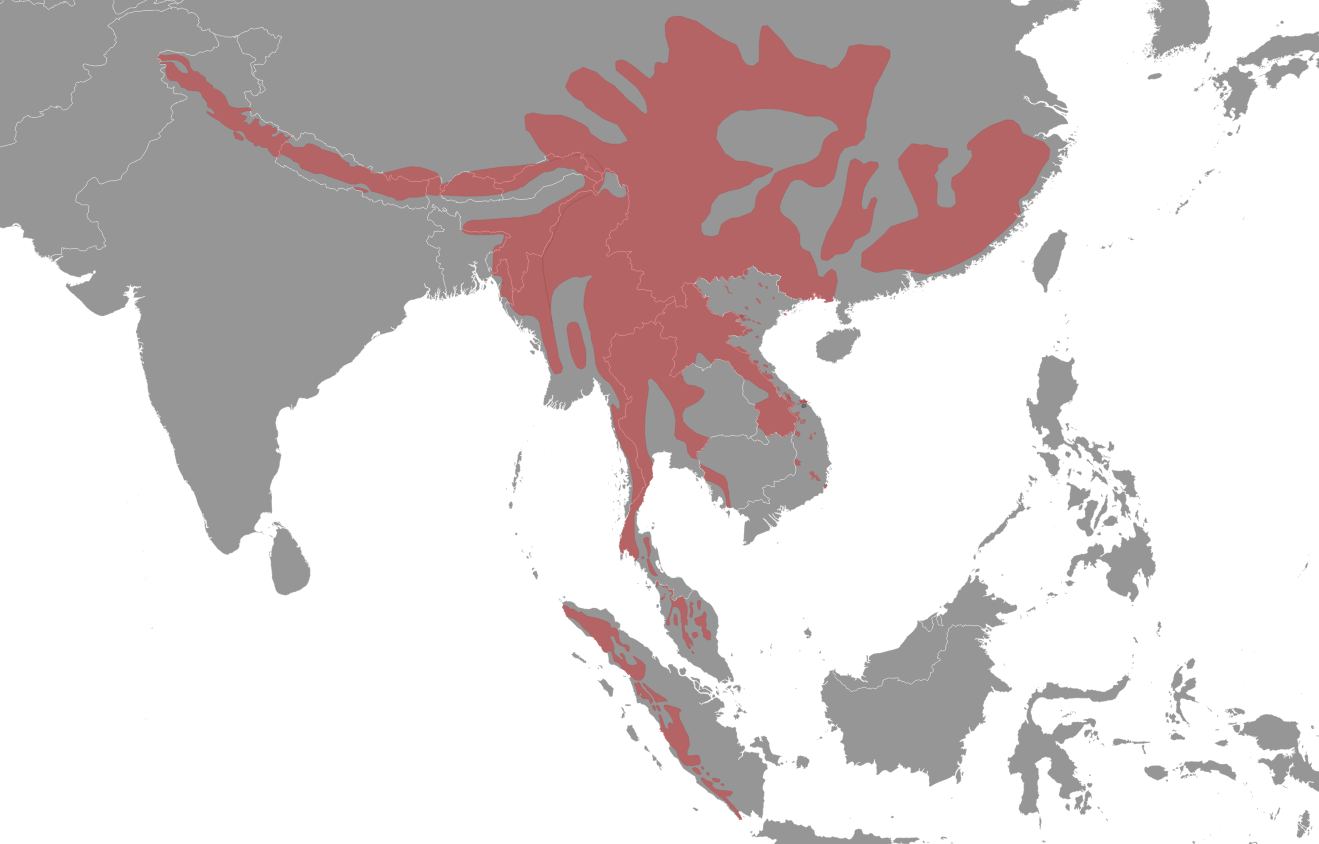

Synonyms
- Naemorhedus sumatraensis; Capricornis milneedwardsii

= Mainland serow =

Mainland serow Temporal range: Middle Pleistocene-Present

Species of antelope

The mainland serow (Capricornis sumatraensis) is a species of serow native to the Himalayas, Southeast Asia and China.

The mainland serow is related closely to the red serow.

== Taxonomy ==
In 1831, Brian Houghton Hodgson first described a goat-like animal with short annulated horns occurring in montane regions between the Sutlej and Teesta Rivers under the name "Bubaline Antelope". As "Bubaline" was preoccupied, he gave it the scientific name Antelope thar a few months later. When William Ogilby described the genus Capricornis in 1838, he determined the Himalayan serow as type species of this genus.

Teeth from a mainland serow were found in a dig in Khok Sung district, estimated to originate from the Middle Pleistocene.

== Characteristics ==
The mainland serow possesses guard hairs on its coat that are bristly or coarse and cover the layer of fur closest to its skin to varying degrees. The animal has a mane that runs from the horns to the middle of the dorsal aspect of the animal between the scapulae covering the skin. The horns are only characteristic of the males and are light-colored, approximately 150 mm (6 in) in length, and curve slightly towards its back. Both male and female are around 91 cm (3 ft) high at the shoulder, and typically weigh around 91 kg (200 lb).

== Distribution and habitat ==
The mainland serow occurs in central and southern China, India, Vietnam, Cambodia, Laos, Myanmar, Thailand, and in the Indonesian island of Sumatra. In Assam, it inhabits hilly forests above an elevation of 300 m (980 ft), but descends to 100 m (330 ft) in winter. It prefers elevations of 2,500–3,500 m (8,200–11,500 ft) in the Nepal Himalayas. In Tibet, its distribution follows forested mountain ranges.

== Behaviour and ecology ==
The mainland serow is territorial and lives alone or in small groups. They are active at varied times, having peaks of diurnal activity and nocturnal activity. Females give birth to a single young after a gestation period of about eight months.

Fossils from Khok Sung in northeastern Thailand suggest it was a forest dweller in this palaeoenvironment. Dental microwear texture analysis of both living and fossil specimens of the Sumatran serow indicate that it is primarily a browsing herbivore and that its browsing activity is dominated by folivory.

== Conservation ==
The mainland serow is protected under CITES Appendix I.
