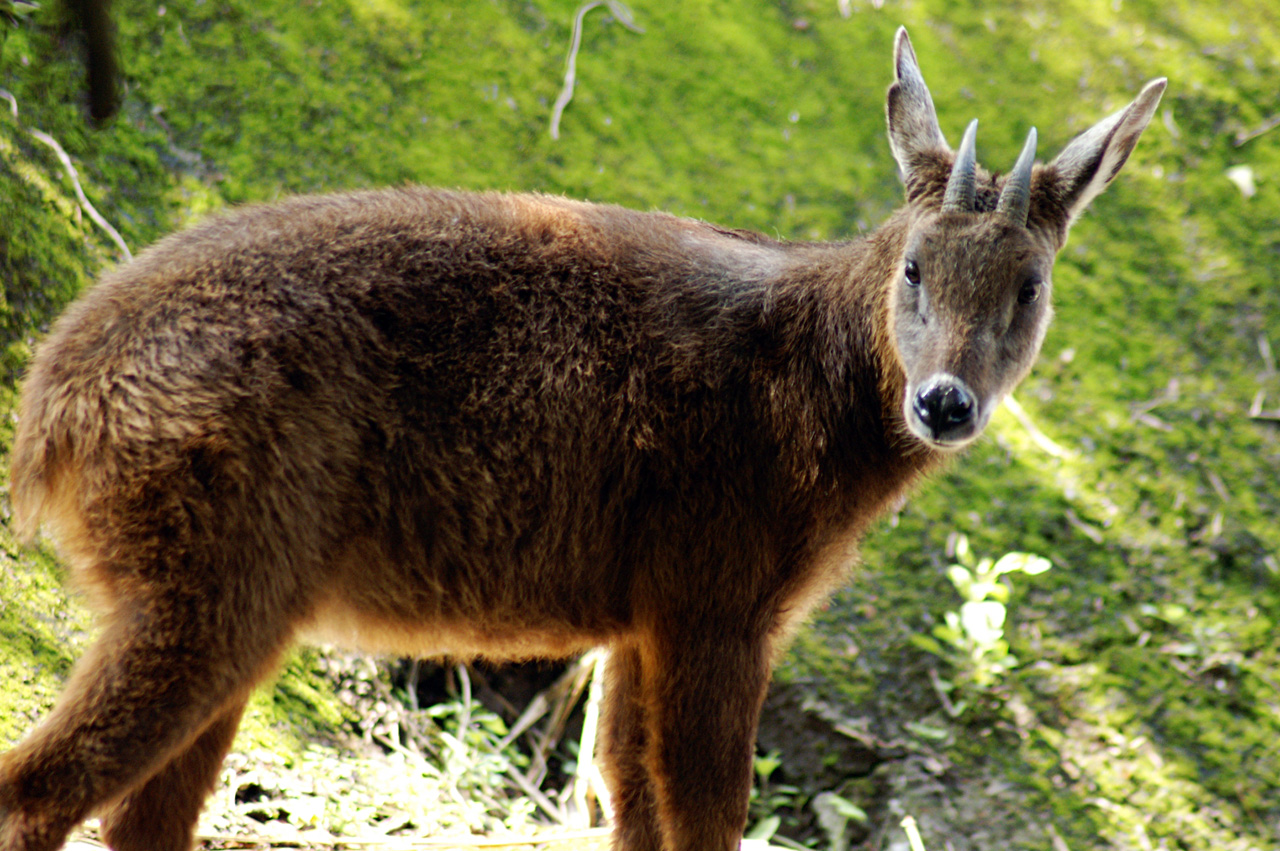

Conservation status
- Least Concern (IUCN 3.1)

Scientific classification
- Kingdom: Animalia
- Phylum: Chordata
- Class: Mammalia
- Order: Artiodactyla
- Family: Bovidae
- Subfamily: Caprinae
- Genus: Capricornis
- Species: C. swinhoei

Binomial name
- Capricornis swinhoei (J. E. Gray, 1862)
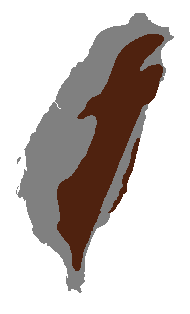
- Distribution of Formosan serow

Synonyms
- Naemorhedus swinhoei

= Taiwan serow =

Species of mammal

The Taiwanese serow (Capricornis swinhoei) also known as the Formosan serow, is a small species of bovid that is endemic to Taiwan.

== Physical characteristics ==
Its torso length is 80–114 cm (31–45 in) and weight 25–35 kg (55–77 lb). Its tail is short, measuring about 6.5 cm (2.6 in). Its color is dark tan with yellow spots on the jaw, throat and nape.

Both sexes bear horns that curve slightly backward and measure 10–20 cm (3.9–7.9 in) in length. The horns are conical in shape and are never shed. The Formosan serow is the only native bovid of Taiwan.

== Lifestyle and behavior ==
They are highly vigilant and not easy to observe. However, their feces are commonly found in Yushan National Park. At dawn and dusk, they graze and browse in the woods alone or in small numbers. They generally eat the leaves below the shoulder height, or vines, ferns, shrubs, or herbs on the ground. In addition, they need to absorb salt and they can be observed licking minerals deposited on cliffs or rocks.

Taiwan serows can jump as high as 2 m (6 ft 7 in) and run as fast as 55 km/h (34 mph) and large males can weigh up to 100 kg (220 lb). Among all mammals in Taiwan, they are the best high jumpers. They can be found at an elevation as low as 50 m (160 ft), but are mostly seen around 1,000 m (3,300 ft), and as high as 3,500 m (11,500 ft). Their habitats include the conifer forest, mixed broad-leaved forests, and the steep slopes of bare rocks and gravel cliffs. They are sometimes spotted on top of Nanhu Mountain, Xueshan, Yushan, and Xiuguluan Mountain. They also live in the Taroko National Park. Their hoofs separate to two sides and can easily hold on to rocks on steep slopes. They are also good tree climbers. They are solitary and territorial. They use tears to smear branches or stones as markers.

== Reproduction ==
September to November is the Taiwan serow's mating season. Their gestation period lasts about seven months. Calves are delivered between next year's March and June. Usually it gives birth to one calf, but can sometimes deliver twins. Newborn calves can stand on their own in just a few hours. Three-month-old calves can feed by themselves, but can still be nursed by mothers. Males do not take care of calves. From six-months to one-year old, calves gradually separate from mothers and live independently. They grow to sexual maturity in two to three years and can live up to approximately 15 years.

== Protected species ==
Since 1989, Taiwan serows have been listed as a rare and valuable species (珍貴稀有保育類) and are protected by Taiwan's Cultural Heritage Preservation Act. The main threats to the Taiwan serow are habitat destruction and harvesting.

== Predators ==
Predator density on Taiwan is low; the principal predator is the Formosan black bear, while a previous predator was the Formosan clouded leopard before it went extinct.

== See also ==
- List of protected species in Taiwan
- List of endemic species of Taiwan
