= Fishing industry in Thailand =

The fishing industry in Thailand, in accordance with usage by The World Bank, the UN's Food and Agriculture Organization (FAO) and other multinational bodies, refers to and encompasses recreational fishing, aquaculture, and wild fisheries ("capture fisheries") both onshore and offshore.

Thailand is a peninsular country of 514,000 km^{2} with over 3,565 km of coastline, 2,700 km on the Gulf of Thailand and 865 km on the Andaman Sea. Its exclusive economic zone extends over 306,000 km^{2}. Historically, fish from Thailand's inshore and offshore waters have been a significant provider of protein to the population. In 2001, the average yearly fish consumption was 32.4 kg per capita and provided on average 10–14 grams of protein per capita per day. It provides 40.5% of animal protein sources and 17.6% of total protein. Consumption of fish is almost certainly higher than reported, as many fish are caught by smallholders and consumed without passing through the marketplace. Aquatic animal numbers are dwindling; in the 1980s, small-scale fishers were able to catch up to eight times as many fish than is possible in the 2000s.

== Statistical overview ==
- Thailand's land area: 514,000 km^{2}
- Thailand's water area: 319,750 km^{2}
- Length of coastline: 2,624 km
- Population: 69 million
- Thailand average annual per capita fish consumption: 27.2 kg (2016) (source: FAO); 31–39 kg (source: DOF); (2016 world per capita, 19.7 kg)
- Commercial fishing vessels: 10,648 (DOF); 25,002 (FAO 2017)
- Commercial fishing crew: 135,407 (62,910 Thai, 72,497 foreign)
- Artisanal fishing vessels: 26,373
- Artisanal fishing workers: 36,923
- Aquaculture: 881,200 tons
- Wild capture: 1,532,000 tons
- Imports: 2,203,444 tons
- Fish canneries: 49
- Fish sauce factories: 54
- Surimi factories: 79
- Frozen fish factories: 150
- Fish processing workers: 237,735 (132,878 Thai, 104,857 foreign)
- Exports (2018): 1,560,417 tons
- Export value (2018): US$6,979 million

== Aquaculture ==
There are two types of aquaculture in Thailand: freshwater aquaculture and brackish water aquaculture.

=== Freshwater aquaculture ===
More than 50 freshwater fish species have been cultured. The most important are catfish (30% of production); Nile tilapia, (29% of production); and silver barb (Barbodes gonionotus) (15% of production).

=== Brackish water aquaculture ===
The most important species are the green mussel with 44% of all production and the giant tiger prawn with 98% of shrimp production and 40% of total production. Thailand's most lucrative aquaculture product is farmed shrimp. They were the world's leading exporter until a disease called Early Mortality Syndrome (EMS) or Hepatopancreatic Acute Necrosis Syndrome (AHPND) hit Thai cultured shrimp production in 2012. This quickly reduced the 540,000 tonnes shrimp supply by 50%. Although the industry has made progress in diagnosing the disease and improving management practices, Thailand's marine shrimp farming sector has not yet recovered to the high levels prior to the outbreak. Shrimp production in 2018 was estimated at 350,000 tonnes.

== Capture fisheries ==
In 2004, Thailand's capture fisheries sector—both inland and marine—constituted 69.3% of total fisheries production. The aquaculture sector contributed 30.7%. Recreational fishing capture is estimated to amount to less than one percent of total catch.

=== Inland capture fisheries ===
In 2003, 3.13 million fishers participated in inland capture fisheries, 60% of them in Isan. In 2005, it was estimated that roughly 14.5% of Thai households earned their living from inland capture fisheries. The catch for 2005 was estimated to be 200,000 tonnes, having a value of 7,853 million baht. The two most important species were silver barb and Nile tilapia.

=== Marine capture fisheries ===
Thailand defines marine capture fisheries as either "small scale fisheries" (SSF) or "large scale fisheries" (LSF). The National Statistical Office and the Fisheries Department define SSF as non-powered, outboard-powered, or inboard powered fishing boats of less than 10 gross tons (GT) generally operating inshore. Coastal fishing operations without boats are included in SSF. Fishing boats greater than 10 gross tons and fishing operations conducted offshore are considered LSF.

From 99 powered trawlers in 1961, the numbers rose to an estimated 57,000 by 2011. In 2017 the FAO estimates the number of powered fishing boats at 25,002 and small boats powered by oars or sail at 436,594.

In 2004, marine production from the Gulf of Thailand contributed to 68.5% of Thailand's total marine catch. The Andaman Sea fishery accounted for the remaining 31.5%.

In LSF, pelagic fish are the dominant catch (34%), followed by rough fish (31%) and demersal fish (19%). Important groups of species are anchovy, short mackerel, big-eye sardines, threadfin beam, round scads, and small tuna. In SSF, shellfish is the dominant catch (24%), followed by pelagic fish (19%), crabs (19%) and squids (13%). The important—i.e., money-making—species are short-necked clams, blue swimming crabs, and short mackerels.

== Production ==
Thailand fisheries production, 1960–2016 (tonnes), and peak year for each fishery
Fishery	1960	1995 peak year	2005 peak year	2009 peak year	2016
Aquaculture	31,545	n/a	n/a	1,416,668	962,571
Capture	199,875	3,031,074	n/a	n/a	1,530,583
Total	231,420	n/a	4,118,527	n/a	2,493,154

=== Exports ===
Fisheries products generate about 20% of Thai food exports. However, fish from both the Andaman Sea and the Gulf of Thailand are decreasing annually and the industry relies on imported raw material such as pollock, salmon, and other white and red meat fish, Thailand's total fishery exports increased by 4% from US$5.6 billion in 2016 to US$5.8 billion in 2017. Major exports in 2017 included canned tuna (US$2.1 billion); processed shrimp/prawns (US$1.8 billion); processed squid/cuttlefish (US$345 million); and canned sardines (US$108 million), which account for three-quarters of total fishery exports. The top five markets for Thai fishery products are Japan, the United States, Australia, Canada, and China. The United States buys more than 50 percent of the Thai shrimp industry's product each year.

=== Imports ===
An increasing shortage of domestic raw materials has driven Thailand to become a large importer of fish products to serve its fishery processing for export. In 2017, Thailand's fishery product imports totalled US$3.4 billion, up 16% from 2016. China is the largest supplier of fishery products to Thailand with US$380.2 million in value, followed by India at US$268.7 million, Taiwan at US$256.3 million, Vietnam at US$229.3 million, and the United States at US$229.2 million. Imports from these five supplying countries account for 40% of total fishery product imports.

== Overfishing ==
Overfishing is the removal of a species of fish from a body of water faster than its replacement rate.

Thailand's marine fish resources are over-exploited. Thailand's marine capture averaged 2,048,753 tonnes from 2003 to 2012; in 2014 the catch was 1,559,746 tonnes, a decrease of 24%. The catch per unit of effort (CPUE) has decreased markedly. CPUE, a measure of the health of fish stocks, fell by 92% in the Gulf of Thailand between 1961 and 2015. In the Andaman Sea it fell by 75% between 1966 and 2015. Average catches in Thai waters have fallen by 86% since the industry's large expansion in the 1960s. In 2014, Thailand was 12th in the world (of 215 nations) (1=worst, 215=best) in terms of fish species at risk (96 species).

In 2011, the pla thu catch in Thai waters was 147,853 tonnes. By 2018, the catch had dropped to 20,461 tonnes. Formerly rich seas off Mae Klong (Samut Songkhram Province) are now home to few fish. Imports from Sri Lanka and Indonesia have become increasingly common.

In 1950, the newly constituted Food and Agriculture Organization (FAO) of the United Nations estimated that, globally, about 20 million metric tons of fish (cod, mackerel, tuna) and invertebrates (lobster, squid, clams) were caught. That catch peaked at 90 million tons per year in the late-1980s, and it has been declining ever since. Thailand is no exception to this decline, despite having had 57,141 fishing vessels and more than 300,000 people employed by the fishing industry. According to the Thai Department of Fisheries, Thailand has 11,000 registered trawlers and about 2,000 illegal trawlers (2016). In 2018 Thailand completed its first-ever census of fishing boats permitted to catch fish in Thai waters: 10,743.

As of February 2018, Thailand's fishing fleet numbers were 38,956, down from 50,023 in 2015, a 22% reduction.

The over-exploitation of fish stocks in Thailand has led to the creation of a huge aquaculture industry, human trafficking to man fishing vessels voyaging further out to sea, and the depletion of "trash fish" as well as marketable juvenile fish to feed the increasing demand for fish meal for farmed shrimp. The wisdom of using captured fish to feed domesticated fish is dubious, according to a researcher. "Using fishmeal in aquaculture,...is not ecologically sustainable because we are still relying on wild-caught fish as input for farmed fish, so producing more farmed fish as a solution to food security does not lessen the pressure on wild-caught fish."

A twelve-month analysis of the catch composition, landing patterns, and biological aspects of sharks caught by Thai commercial fishing boats in the Andaman Sea off Thailand showed a significant difference from the results of a similar study done in 2004. Largely absent were slow-growing, late–maturing, low-fecundity species. Their absence suggests that the populations of these groups of apex predators may be close to collapse.

Thai surimi production had fallen from around 100,000 tonnes in 2012 to just over 52,000 tonnes in 2017. Fish prices for the species from which tropical surimi is typically made—itoyori, eso, flying fish, sea bream, and ribbonfish—are rising in spite of stable low wages. Surimi expert Jae Park of Oregon State University says of Thai surimi fish: "They're overharvested, they're really overharvested".

One response of the government has been a program to buy back 1,300 sub-standard trawlers to reduce overfishing. Thailand has 10,500 registered commercial trawlers. The 1,300 boats to be purchased by the government failed licensing standards after the government imposed more stringent, environmentally friendly laws. In December 2017, the cabinet approved the buyback to pacify boat owners. Buyback costs are equivalent to 40,000 baht per gross ton, equating to 400,000 baht to 2.4 million baht per boat. As of August 2018, the government has not disbursed buyback funds. The National Fisheries Association of Thailand says its members will stop fishing unless the government pays for the 1,300 decommissioned trawlers. On 3 August 2018, the Fisheries Department announced that it would buy-back 680 unlicensed fishing boats for three billion baht.

Climate change poses a serious threat to the sustainability of the fisheries industry in the ASEAN region including Thailand.

On 9 June 2020, the Department of Fisheries met with concerned parties to discuss new maximum sustainable yield (MSY) fishing quotas for Thai waters. The quotas would limit the number of fish that can be harvested to avoid long-term depletion. Quotas are in the process of being established and have not yet been set. At present, in addition to existing quotas, commercial trawlers are restricted to fishing for 240 days in the Gulf of Thailand and 270 days in the Andaman Sea. Trawler owners, represented by the National Fisheries Association of Thailand (NFAT), oppose new quotas. An NFAT spokesman charged that "The new system is not suitable for the ecology of Thailand's waters,..." Instead, NFAT countered that the best way to reduce overfishing is for the government to purchase 2,700 of the existing 10,500 commercial trawlers and retire them. NFAT threatened to demonstrate in Bangkok if their demands are not met by the government.

== Illegal, unreported and unregulated fishing ==
In the South China Sea, due to stock depletion and territorial disputes, there has been the emergence of a 'race-to-fish' mentality. Increasing levels of Illegal, Unreported, and Unregulated (IUU) fishing, with an estimated 50% of catches in the region going unreported. As Captains seek to meet market demands, an increasing number of long-haul fishing vessels has emerged. Due to the remote nature of such work, an increased number of labour malpractices has been found, with cases of individuals working nearly 24-hour days for around $10 per month. A 2012 survey from the International Labour Organization (ILO) upholds this claim. Based on 600 workers, it concluded that forced labour accounted for 16% of workers on long-haul vessels, compared to 3% of workers on short-haul vessels. Another report highlighting human rights abuses uncovered that over 2,000 victims of human trafficking had been rescued off Thai fishing vessels in a remote part of Indonesia.

Before 2015, Thailand's fishery policy was governed under the Fisheries Act B.E. 2490 (1947). Such legislation failed to meet international standards to combat IUU fishing, set out under UNCLOS, overlooking issues such as human trafficking at sea, and other labour violations. Additionally, since 1997 there have been several decentralisation policies leading to both small-scale and large-scale fisheries being divided on territorial grounds into either Sub-District Administrative Organisation or the Provincial Administrative Organisation. Ambiguities regarding the governance of fisheries was intensified as a result, a lack of definitional clarity led to the increased use of forced labour on IUU vessels.

On 21 April 2015, the European Union (EU) threatened Thailand, the third-largest seafood exporter in the world, with a trade ban if it did not take action on IUU fishing. Under recent predictions, the EU constitutes the worlds largest seafood market, comprising 34% of the overall market imports internationally. With such high levels of influence, the EU is able to set out a framework for combatting IUU fishing. Under the Council Regulation (EC) No 1005/2008, a three-tiered carding system came into force on the 1 January 2010. With exporters being categorised into red, yellow, or green cards. The EU will liaise with the exporting nation, to better gauge the severity of IUU fishing and existing countermeasures.

In 2015, following the media exposés, the EU imposed a "yellow card" on Thailand, a warning that the country was not sufficiently combating IUU fishing. Thailand failed to certify the origin and legality of its fish exports to the EU and was given six months, until October 2015, to implement a satisfactory action plan to address the shortcomings. EU fisheries commissioner Karmenu Vella declared that "Analysing what is happening in Thailand, we noticed that there are no controls whatsoever, there are no efforts whatsoever." The EU imported 145,907 tons of fish products worth €642 million from Thailand in 2014. In the view of the Bangkok Post, "The [Thai] fisheries bureaucracy's record is extremely shabby, resulting in a breakdown in state regulation of commercial trawlers. Fisheries officials are also known to have cosy relationships with trawler operators."

Only seven months after the yellow card was issued, a more extensive legal framework was brought into Thai law. Repealing the prior legislation, the Royal Ordinance on Fisheries B.E. 2558 (2015) was enacted, and later amended to B.E. 2560. Following discussions with the EU, it became clear that the new legislation must provide (1) a more comprehensive legal framework to target IUU fishing; (2) an advancement of monitoring, control, and surveillance (MCS) and tracking systems; and (3) a consolidated approach to IUU law enforcement. To achieve these objectives the Thai government signed several international treaties and allocated €87 million (2015-2018) to implement the new measures.

In a press release dated 21 April 2016, the European Commission updated its assessment of Thailand's progress, saying, "The dialogue is proving difficult, and there remain serious concerns about the steps taken by Thailand to fight IUU fishing activities. This means that further action by the Commission cannot be ruled out. A meeting with the Thai authorities in May [2016] will be a new opportunity for them to show their goodwill and commitment."

Internationally, Thailand is perceived as a 'success' case in combating IUU fishing, with the EU retracting Thailand's yellow card on 8 January 2019. The EU pointed to Thai measures that included amending its fisheries legal framework in line with international laws of the sea; ensuring compliance with its obligations as a flag, port, coastal, and market state, including updated legislation; establishing a clear and enforceable set of sanctions; and bolstering its control of the national fishing fleet by enhancing monitoring, power, and surveillance systems, including remote sensing of fishing activities and a strict policy of inspections at port. Some of the international treaties Thailand has signed to combat IUU fishing are the United Nations Fish Stock Agreement (UNFSA); Agreement on Port State Measures to Prevent, Deter and Eliminate IUU fishing (PSMA); in addition to other agreements the Regional Fisheries Management Organisation (RFMO).

However, the approach to combatting IUU fishing in Thailand has not been described as successful on all levels. With a complete near overhaul of fisheries management between 2015-2019, the approach has been dominated by top-down national and international voices, often excluding local opinions, and obtaining data from secondary sources. Due to legal restrictions on forming unions, fish workers, particularly migrants, are given little space to voice opinions regarding fishery management. In December 2019, commercial fishers across Thailand rallied to protest newly imposed restrictions designed to counter IUU. The protests were short-lived and ended when the government agreed to implement a number of measures to appease the fishermen, including compensation payouts to fishers whose boats were grounded because they did not meet the government's minimum requirements under its new anti-IUU restrictions. The government will also help retrain fishers to switch to other professions. Boats that were barred from fishing because they failed to meet the state's minimum requirements will be given 30 additional fishing days. A joint committee of state agencies and fishing associations will be formed to study other demands for more lax restrictions.

== Fishing practices ==
The Thai Department of Marine and Coastal Resources reported that the deaths of "400 rare marine animals" in 2017 were due to destructive fishing practices and equipment. Of the death toll, 57% were sea turtles, 38% dolphins and whales, and five percent dugongs. Fishing gear was the major cause, followed by disease and pollution. The death toll has hovered around 400 for three consecutive years and represents less than 10% of the 5,000 rare species found in Thailand's territorial waters. The department estimates that there are around 2,000 dolphins and whales, 3,000 sea turtles, and 250 dugongs living in Thai waters. All are protected as rare species.

Sharks were once common in Thai waters. Marine scientists now say that they may be close to collapse. Researchers examined bycatch on returning fishing boats at several Thai ports over a year. They discovered a sharp decline in the shark population. They also noted shifts in population composition compared to a previous study in 2004. They managed to count 2,123 sharks, and recorded only 17 shark species, compared with 64 species reported in 2004. In Thailand, sharks are often caught as bycatch when other species are being targeted. Bycatch in Thailand is largely unregulated, leaving, for example, only about 100 whale sharks in Thai waters according to the Department of Coastal and Marine Resources. Thailand has been attempting to protect the species following an international commitment, the "International Plan of Action for Conservation and Management of Sharks", initiated by the FAO. It has been developing the "National Plan of Action for Conservation and Management of Sharks", but as of 2018 it remains unimplemented.

The period from 2012 to 2016 saw Thailand export 22,467 tons of shark fins, the primary ingredient in shark fin soup—a Chinese dish signalling wealth and privilege—making it among the world's leading exporters. As of 2017, 52 nations have implemented some form of ban on shark finning or fishing. Twelve countries have banned shark fishing altogether. But Indonesia, Malaysia, and Thailand still permit shark "finning" and shark fishing. A study commissioned by WildAid, found that 57% of urban Thais have consumed shark fin at some point and 61% plan to consume shark fin in the future. More than 100 Bangkok restaurants serve shark fin soup An uproar ensued in December 2019 when it was discovered that Thai government officials, including the prime and interior ministers, and their coalition party allies, were served shark fin soup at a dinner at the Rajpruek Club in Bangkok. Conservation groups and academics accused the government of obliviousness regarding environmental issues, especially as the dinner came only a day before Thai Environment Day. According to a survey on Thai shark fin consumption by WildAid-Thailand, shark fin soup is served at 72% of all weddings, 61% of family gatherings, and 47% of business functions. Thailand, they found, is among the world's largest consumers of shark fins.

Media coverage by The Guardian, Associated Press, and New York Times of forced labor in Thai fishing in 2014 and 2015 focused attention on the industry. Research published by the International Labor Organization (ILO) in 2018 identified persistent labor abuses in the industry, but also noted progress made to eliminate them.

== Legal framework ==
Many laws deal with aspects of Thai fisheries. These are the most salient according to the FAO:

- Royal Ordinance on Fisheries B.E. 2560 (2017)
- Royal Ordinance on Fisheries B.E.2558 (2015)
- The Wildlife Reservation and Protection Act, B.E. 2535 (1992)
- The Enhancement and Conservation of National Environmental Quality Act, B.E. 2535 (1992)
- Fisheries Act B.E. 2490 (1947) Revised in 1953 and 1985.
- The Act Governing the Right to Fish in Thai Waters, B.E. 2482 (1939)
- The Thai Vessel Act, B.E. 2481 (1938)

The Thai Fisheries Act of 2015 imposes financial sanctions for illegal fishing and imposed restrictions on destructive gear types. The enforcement of an inshore exclusion zone also helped protect the rights of small-scale fishers.

Thailand ratified the International Labour Organization's (ILO) "Work in Fishing Convention (Convention 188)" on 30 January 2019. It is the first country in Asia to ratify it. The convention comes into force in Thailand on 30 January 2020. New regulations dictate that fishermen have to be in possession of their own identification documents, receive and sign a written contract, be paid monthly, annual health checks for crew, transportation for crew from foreign ports to Thailand, social security schemes, and certified good working and living conditions. Thai fisher associations have balked at some of the convention's measures citing cost as the main factor. The Pattani Fisheries Association argues that 99% of trawlers cannot meet C188 demands as their boats either can't be modified or their owners don't have the money to do so. However, the ILO analysis of gaps between Thai law and the ILO Work in Fishing Convention makes clear that modifications to existing vessels are not required by the convention. Ratification of the convention was contested by 22 fisher associations who threatened to strike if their grievances were not addressed. Support for labor reforms driven by the Work in Fishing Convention is strong. Thai and international unions, civil society organizations, and major U.K. seafood buyers including Lyons Seafood, Morrisons, Sainsbury's, and Waitrose urged the Thai Prime Minister in September 2019 to reject efforts by the Fisheries Association to roll back basic labor protections for workers in the fishing industry.

== Governmental interventions ==
- In 1983, the Fisheries Department introduced a regulation that banned fishing with lights, a destructive practice. It aimed to save small fish and prevent Overfishing. The ban was lifted in 1996, after intensive lobbying by operators of commercial trawlers.
- In December 2019, Agriculture and Cooperatives Minister Chalermchai Sri-on, who oversees the Fisheries Department, yielded to the demands of the National Fisheries Association of Thailand (NFAT), which represents major commercial fishing boat operators from 22 coastal provinces. The operators, aided by strong political connections, threatened to stage a prolonged protest and halt all fishing if the government did not their demands, which included the relaxation of strict laws introduced by the previous government and that the government spend 10 billion baht to purchase boats from fishers whose businesses collapsed due to those laws.

== Associations and affiliations ==
There are 22 coastal provinces in Thailand. Each has an association.

- National Fisheries Association of Thailand
- Thai Fishery Producers Coalition
- Thai Tuna Industry Association

National membership in regional fishery bodies

- Asia-Pacific Fishery Commission
- Indian Ocean Tuna Commission
- Mekong River Commission
- Network of Aquaculture Centers in Asia-Pacific
- Southeast Asian Fisheries Development Center

== See also ==
- Fishing by country
- Fishing industry by country
- Mariculture
- Marine shrimp farming
- Outline of fishing
