= Department of Fisheries (Thailand) =

- กรมประมง krom pramong
- Seal of Varuna, god of water riding on a Naga in a pavilion, supported by Anon, the great fish

Agency overview
- Formed: 1933
- Preceding agencies: Ministry of Lands and Agriculture (1921); Department of Aquatic Animal Conservation (1926)
- Headquarters: 50 Phahonyothin Road, Lat Yao, Chatuchak District, Bangkok
- Annual budget: 4,094 million baht (FY2019)
- Agency executive: Thitiporn Laoprasert, Director-General
- Parent agency: Ministry of Agriculture and Cooperatives
- Website: www.fisheries.go.th/en

Thailand's Department of Fisheries (Abrv: DOF; Thai: กรมประมง, RTGS: krom pramong), part of the Ministry of Agriculture and Cooperatives, is responsible for the promotion of the Thai fishing industry while ensuring the sustainability of aquaculture and capture fisheries. It conducts, compiles, and disseminates research and technologies to further those aims. Its mission statement makes no mention of illegal, unreported and unregulated fishing (IUU), the responsibility of other agencies such as the Ministry of Labour.

== History ==
The government began to take an interest in Thai fisheries management in 1901, primarily as a source of taxes and tariffs.

A royal proclamation on 22 September 1921 gave the Ministry of Lands and Agriculture responsibility for aquaculture, preservation of aquatic animals, and regulating fishing equipment.

The Department of Aquatic Animal Conservation was established on 21 September 1926. It was renamed the Department of Fisheries (DOF) in 1933, then combined with the Department of Agriculture as the Department of Agriculture and Fisheries. Two years later, it was again made a separate department. In 1954 it assumed its current name, Krom Pramong, 'Department of Fisheries'.

== Mission ==
The department is both a promotional and regulatory agency, with emphasis on the former.

== Organization ==
DOF's central administration is composed of 24 units. At the local level, the department has offices in all 76 provinces as well as 527 DOF district offices.

== Budget ==
The DOF's budget was 4,094 million baht in FY2019, down from 4,457 million baht in FY2018.

== Legal framework ==
Many laws deal with aspects of Thai fisheries. These are the most salient according to the FAO:

- Royal Ordinance on Fisheries B.E. 2560 (2017)
- Royal Ordinance on Fisheries B.E.2558 (2015)
- The Wildlife Reservation and Protection Act, B.E. 2535 (1992)
- The Enhancement and Conservation of National Environmental Quality Act, B.E. 2535 (1992)
- Fisheries Act B.E. 2490 (1947) Revised in 1953 and 1985.
- The Act Governing the Right to Fish in Thai Waters, B.E. 2482 (1939)
- The Thai Vessel Act, B.E. 2481 (1938)

== Activity ==
The Pramong Nomklao Fair (งานประมงน้อมเกล้า, lit. 'Royal Fisheries Fair') has been held annually since 1986 at various locations or leading shopping malls in Bangkok and nearby areas. The event not only promotes Thailand's ornamental fish farming industry but also serves to honour Prince Mahidol Adulyadej. Organized jointly by the Department of Fisheries and Siriraj Hospital, the fair celebrates the Prince's role as a patron of Thai students who received scholarships to pursue advanced studies in fisheries abroad, at a time when the country's fisheries sector was just beginning to take root.

== See also ==
- Fisheries management
- Ocean fisheries
- Thailand fisheries
- World fish production
