= Dusit Zoo =

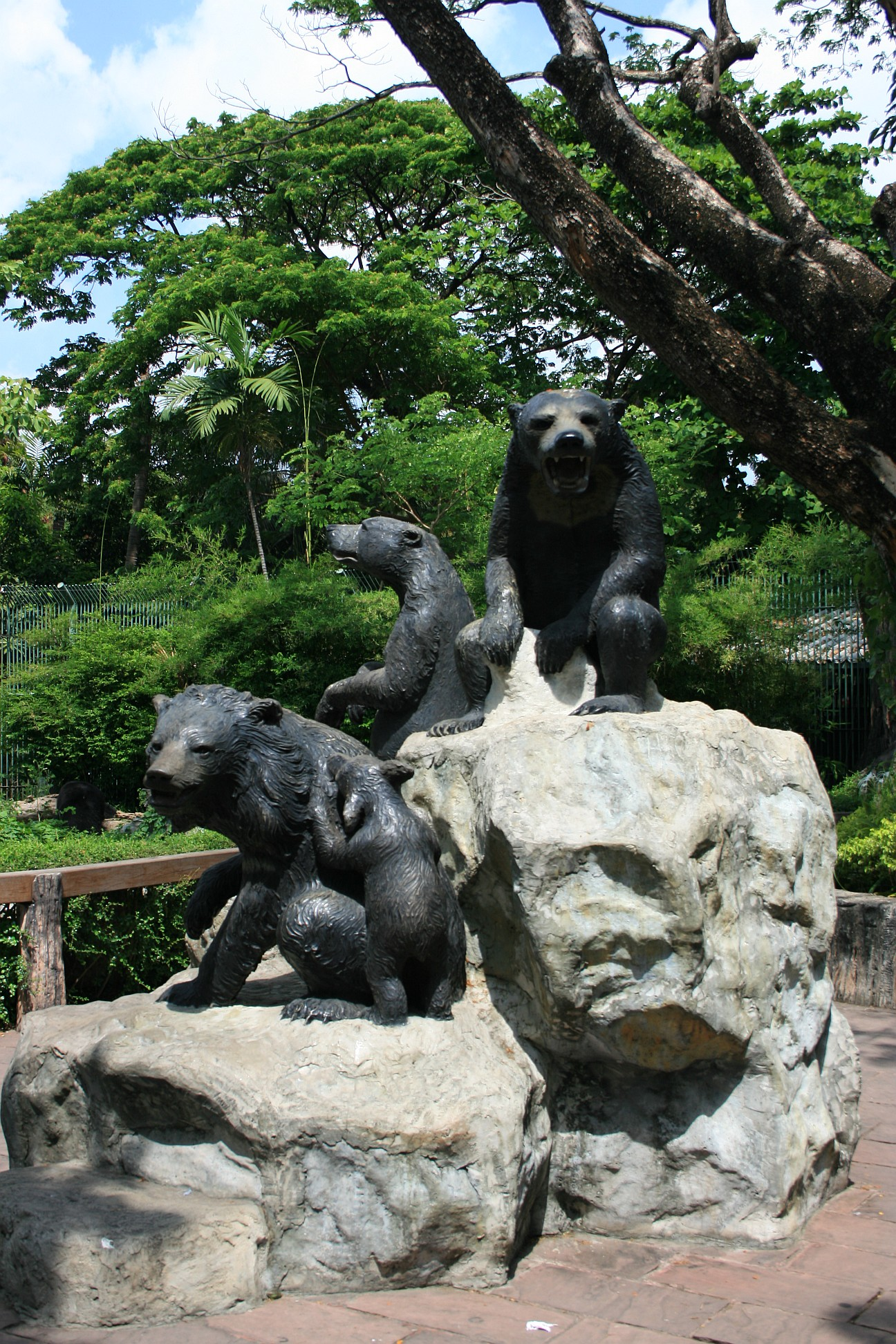
- Bear statue at the zoo
- Interactive map of Dusit Zoo
- 13°46′21″N 100°30′59″E
- Date opened: 1938
- Date closed: 30 September 2018
- Location: Bangkok, Thailand
- No. of animals: 2218
- No. of species: 329
- Owner: Zoological Park Organization

Dusit Zoo (Thai: สวนสัตว์ดุสิต) or popularly known as Khao Din Wana (เขาดินวนา) and Khao Din (เขาดิน) was a zoo in Bangkok, Thailand. Located at Khao Din Park in Bangkok's Dusit District next to the old parliament house and Dusit Palace, it was the oldest zoo in Thailand.

== History ==
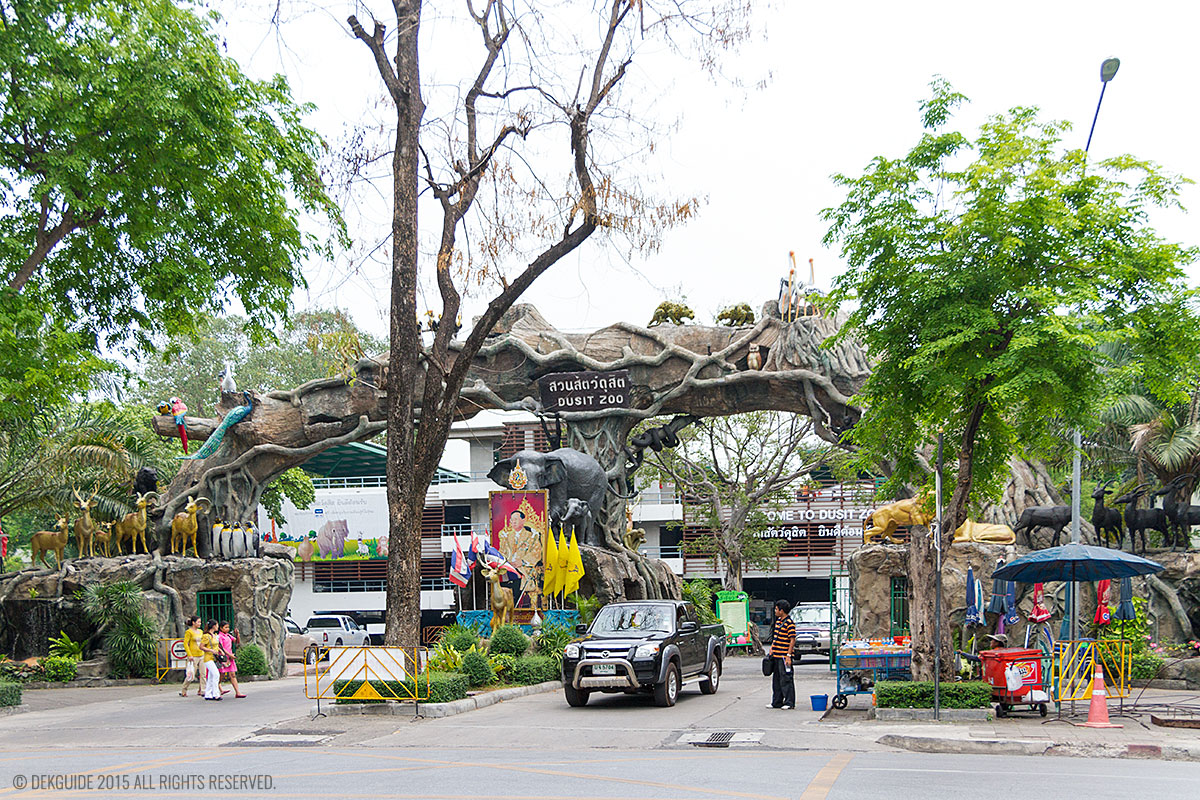
Dusit Zoo entrance

Dusit Zoo was originally built by King Chulalongkorn (Rama V) as his private garden adjacent to the royal palace. After the king's death, the garden was left unattended for years.

In 1938, the constitutional government asked King Rama VIII's regency council to give the park to the Bangkok City Municipality to be opened as a public zoo. The King donated deer and a number of other animals from the palace for public exhibition. The City of Bangkok operated the zoo until 1954. It was then transferred to the state Zoological Park Organization, which also operates Khao Kheow Open Zoo, Chiang Mai Zoo, Songkhla Zoo and Nakhon Ratchasima Zoo. Dusit Zoo, or "Khao Din", spanned a total area of 188,800 square meters, and was regarded as the most popular zoo in Thailand, attracting approximately 2.5 million visitors annually.

In August 2018, the Zoological Park Organization announced that the zoo would close and relocate to a new site in Thanyaburi District, Pathum Thani Province. After the announcement, the zoo extended its opening hours until 30 September 2018.

== Number of animals ==
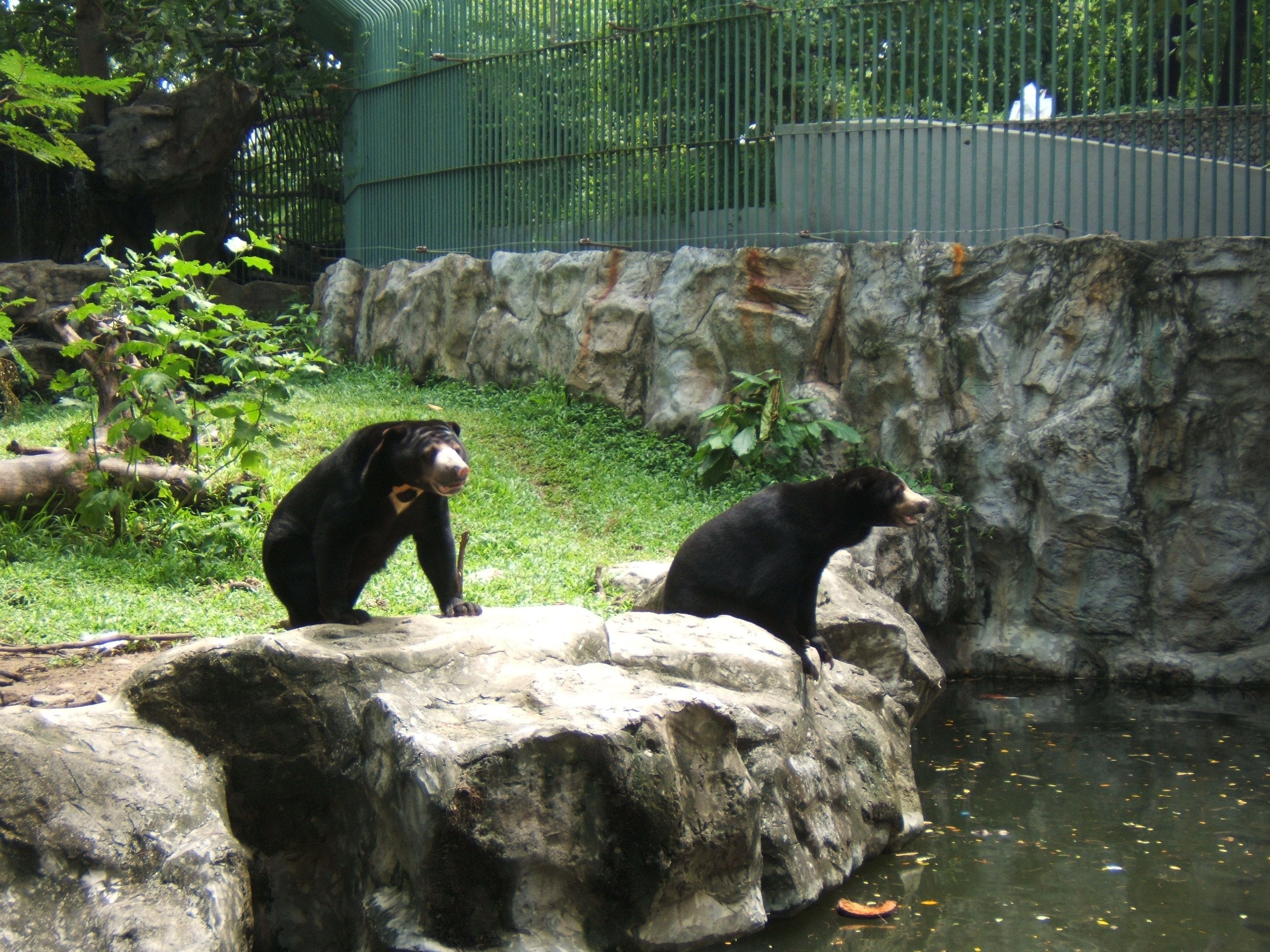
Bear in Dusit Zoo

Dusit Zoo was located in the heart of Bangkok, with over 1600 species of domestic and international animals, including:

- 331 mammals
- 170 reptiles
- 849 birds

== Highlights ==
Dusit Zoo was home to a variety of animals, ranging from American alligators, Humboldt penguins, red pandas, and hippopotamuses, to brow-antlered deer, Asian elephants, red-shanked doucs, and Malayan tapirs. The Albino Indian muntjac and white tigers were also rare highlights at the zoo. Play Land offered rides and amusement facilities to entertain children throughout the day, while boat peddling and the sightseeing train provided different modes of exploration. Dusit Zoo also contained an animal hospital, zoo museum, and educational center.

== Admission ==
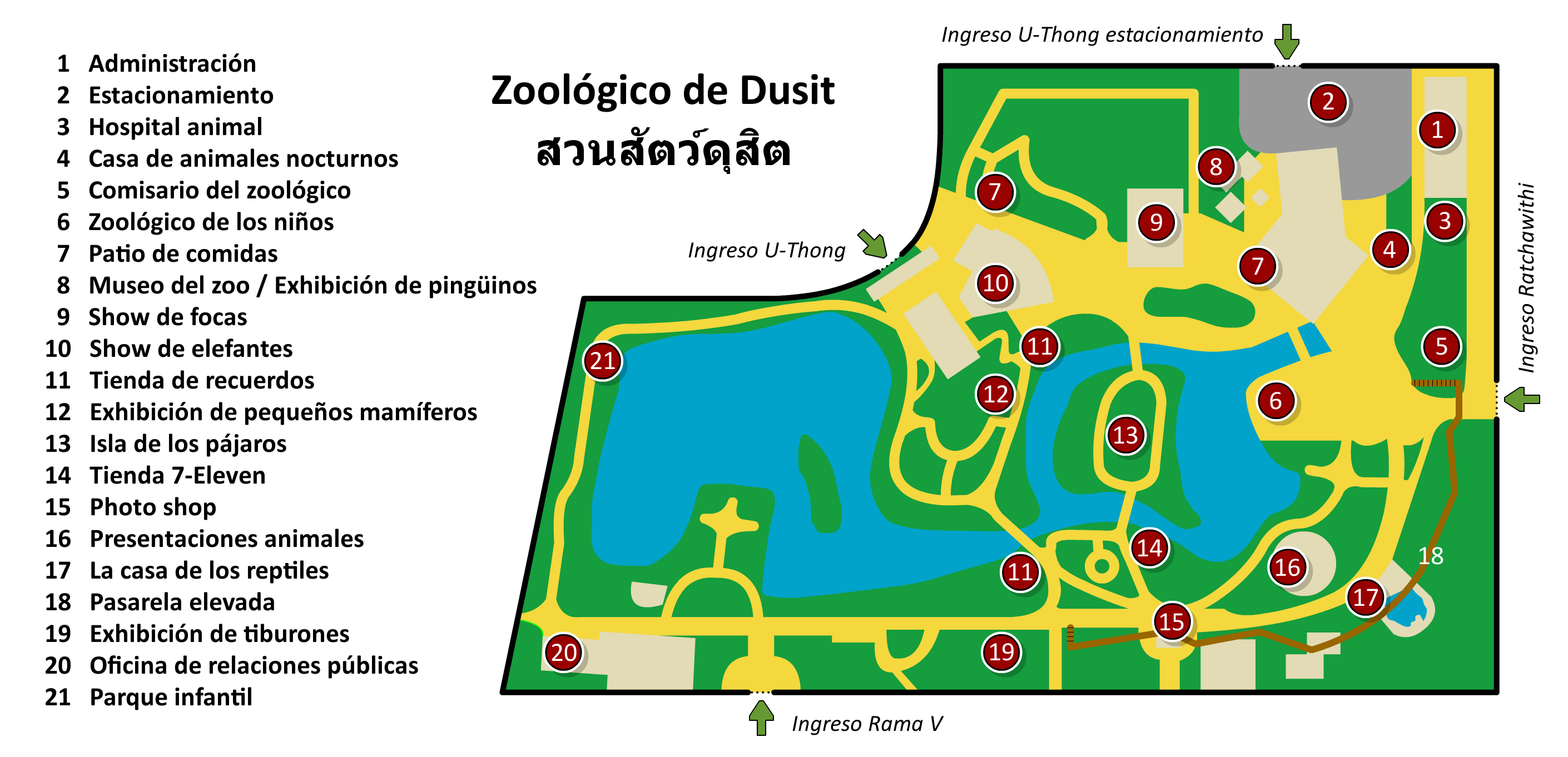
Dusit zoo map

Dusit Zoo operated from 8am to 6pm.

Zoo entry fee: Thai citizens

- 100 Baht for adults
- 50 Baht for teachers, university students, government officers in uniform
- 20 Baht for children
- Free of charge for elderly (60 years of age or above), handicapped, monks

Foreigners

- 150 Baht for adults
- 70 Baht for children

== See also ==
- Bangkok Aquarium
