= Bangkok Aquarium =

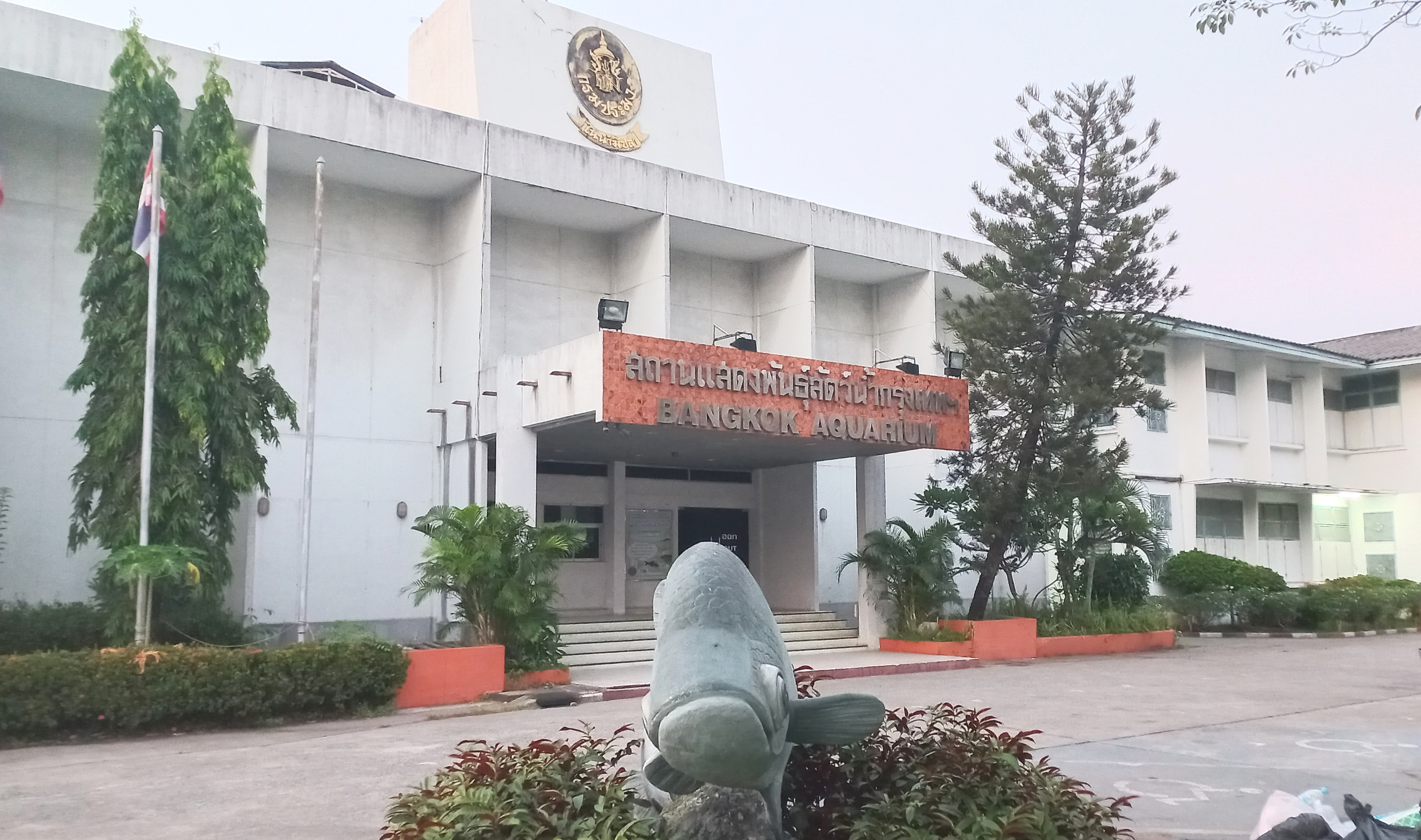
- Interactive map of Bangkok Aquarium
- 13°50′33″N 100°34′32″E
- Date opened: 1940
- Location: Chatuchak, Bangkok, Thailand
- No. of species: 560 freshwater fish; 100 plant
- Management: Department of Fisheries
- Website: www.fisheries.go.th

The Bangkok Aquarium (Thai: สถานแสดงพันธุ์สัตว์น้ำจืดกรุงเทพมหานคร or สถานแสดงพันธุ์สัตว์น้ำกรุงเทพฯ), founded in 1940, is the oldest aquarium in Thailand. Located at the Kasetsart University main campus in Bangkok, the aquarium is home to about 560 species of freshwater fish native to Thailand as well as about 100 species of aquarium plants. The showcase species include Chao Phraya giant catfish, Siamese giant carp, and Siamese tigerfish. The aquarium is owned and operated by the Thailand Department of Fisheries.

== Information ==
Location: In the campus of Kasetsart University, Phahonyothin Road, Lat Yao Sub-district, Chatuchak District, Bangkok.

Getting there: by bus: (BMTA buses) 26, 34, 39, 59, 107, 114, 129, 185, 503, 522, 543 (Nonthaburi Pier) (affiliated & minibuses) 34, 39, 51, 126, 524; by BTS Skytrain: Kasetsart University BTS station: exit 1

Opening hours: 10.00 – 16.00 hours (closed on Mondays)

Admission fee: 20 baht/ person
