= Fishing industry by country =

This page lists global fisheries production. The tonnage from capture fisheries and aquaculture is listed by country.

== Global Fisheries Production by Country (2023) ==
The following is a sortable table of global fisheries harvest in 2023 measured in thousand tonnes. The tonnage from capture fisheries and aquaculture is listed by country. Both methods include marine fish, freshwater fish, molluscs, crustaceans, diadromous fish, and other miscellaneous aquatic animals.

World capture fisheries and aquaculture production from FAO World Food and Agriculture – Statistical Yearbook 2025

↑ By species group

↑ By production source

↑ By main producers (2023)

Country	Aquaculture	Capture	Total
China	55,481.5	13,925.2	69,406.7
India	11,315.4	6,105.6	17,421.0
Indonesia	5,599.6	7,732.6	13,332.2
Vietnam	5,368.1	3,417.2	8,785.3
Russia	326.5	5,385.5	5,712.0
Bangladesh	2,852.0	2,062.7	4,914.7
United States	455.6	4,147.2	4,602.8
Norway	1,649.8	2,356.0	4,005.8
Chile	1,487.4	2,144.9	3,632.3
Peru	105.1	3,485.0	3,590.1
Japan	580.7	2,848.8	3,429.5
Myanmar	1,197.0	1,623.2	2,820.2
Philippines	757.8	1,714.1	2,471.9
Thailand	1,001.2	1,466.2	2,467.4
Mexico	276.7	1,842.7	2,119.4
Egypt	1,552.4	448.7	2,001.1
Ecuador	1,234.0	695.0	1,929.0
South Korea	562.6	1,309.5	1,872.1
Brazil	792.0	778.8	1,570.8
Malaysia	282.3	1,282.6	1,564.9
Morocco	2.3	1,391.6	1,393.9
Iran	616.7	764.5	1,381.2
Iceland	49.6	1,300.0	1,349.6
Nigeria	258.8	799.6	1,058.4
Turkey	556.3	454.1	1,010.4
Spain	243.1	763.7	1,006.8
United Kingdom	183.1	720.3	903.4
Cambodia	313.0	551.7	864.7
Uganda	130.0	716.5	846.5
Argentina	5.5	827.2	832.7
Canada	146.2	666.2	812.4
Mauritania	–	795.6	795.6
Oman	5.1	677.4	682.5
Pakistan	168.7	510.0	678.7
France	186.1	421.5	607.6
Angola	10.3	548.2	558.5
Tanzania	34.9	519.0	553.9
Denmark	33.1	495.3	528.4
Senegal	1.6	521.7	523.3
Ghana	100.0	384.4	484.4
New Zealand	109.2	326.6	435.8
South Africa	6.0	422.6	428.6
Guinea	6.0	414.2	420.2
Mozambique	6.0	413.5	419.5
Sri Lanka	59.2	337.9	397.1
Namibia	0.3	373.1	373.4
Netherlands	41.6	267.6	309.2
Colombia	203.0	99.5	302.5
Australia	120.3	180.1	300.4
North Korea	77.7	208.1	285.8
Democratic Republic of the Congo	5.5	261.8	267.3
Italy	126.0	127.1	253.1
Venezuela	57.3	194.2	251.5
Cameroon	12.2	229.3	241.5
Kiribati	–	239.2	239.2
Panama	14.7	219.5	234.2
Papua New Guinea	1.9	220.5	222.4
Ireland	34.6	187.1	221.7
Malawi	4.8	212.8	217.6
Germany	35.0	182.5	217.5
Georgia	2.5	213.6	216.1
Laos	140.0	73.2	213.2
Poland	40.7	171.8	212.5
Saudi Arabia	138.8	69.1	207.9
Sierra Leone	0.2	206.9	207.1
Greece	141.9	63.0	204.9
Belize	0.9	197.7	198.6
Uzbekistan	140.3	55.6	195.9
Portugal	22.4	162.3	184.7
Zambia	76.6	101.8	178.4
Sweden	11.4	154.7	166.1
Federated States of Micronesia	–	162.5	162.5
Kenya	32.1	129.5	161.6
Maldives	–	160.7	160.7
Yemen	–	151.0	151.0
Madagascar	9.8	139.2	149.0
Finland	15.2	128.1	143.3
Seychelles	–	139.2	139.2
Ethiopia	2.7	131.4	134.1
Tunisia	21.2	108.1	129.3
Honduras	102.8	20.3	123.1
Mali	9.0	111.1	120.1
Nepal	92.7	21.0	113.7
Chad	0.1	109.0	109.1
Lithuania	4.3	102.4	106.7
Nauru	–	103.2	103.2
Nicaragua	32.0	56.5	88.5
Ivory Coast	8.8	78.4	87.2
Croatia	26.8	56.2	83.0
Algeria	5.3	77.1	82.4
Estonia	0.9	76.6	77.5
Marshall Islands	–	73.9	73.9
Vanuatu	–	69.9	69.9
El Salvador	13.4	55.8	69.2
Latvia	0.8	66.8	67.6
Uruguay	0.1	67.1	67.2
Azerbaijan	3.4	63.0	66.4
Iraq	23.9	42.1	66.0
Guinea-Bissau	–	65.0	65.0
Republic of the Congo	1.7	60.2	61.9
United Arab Emirates	2.3	59.4	61.7
Guatemala	42.5	14.0	56.5
Gambia	0.1	55.5	55.6
Benin	3.1	52.1	55.2
Kazakhstan	17.1	35.8	52.9
Costa Rica	16.5	33.9	50.4
Niger	0.5	49.4	49.9
Tuvalu	–	49.0	49.0
South Sudan	0.1	47.0	47.1
Sudan	5.5	41.0	46.5
Ukraine	15.3	28.2	43.5
Solomon Islands	–	40.0	40.0
Rwanda	7.3	31.6	38.9
Paraguay	20.2	18.0	38.2
Guyana	1.6	36.4	38.0
Mauritius	2.4	35.5	37.9
Bolivia	29.1	7.9	37.0
Zimbabwe	8.7	26.2	34.9
Kyrgyzstan	33.6	0.0	33.6
Fiji	0.2	32.2	32.4
Libya	–	32.1	32.1
Suriname	–	31.9	31.9
Burkina Faso	1.1	30.3	31.4
Gabon	0.1	29.9	30.0
Somalia	–	30.0	30.0
Liberia	1.4	28.2	29.6
Central African Republic	0.4	29.0	29.4
Cuba	12.8	13.4	26.2
Armenia	24.8	1.1	25.9
Togo	1.6	22.2	23.8
Malta	20.8	2.0	22.8
Hungary	17.8	4.6	22.4
Czech Republic	18.6	3.4	22.0
Dominican Republic	3.8	17.3	21.1
Burundi	0.6	20.1	20.7
Brunei	1.7	17.7	19.4
Albania	9.3	10.0	19.3
Qatar	0.1	19.0	19.1
Belgium	0.3	18.0	18.3
Bahrain	0.1	18.0	18.1
Haiti	1.7	16.4	18.1
Romania	11.3	6.6	17.9
Bulgaria	9.9	6.7	16.6
Israel	14.5	2.1	16.6
Turkmenistan	0.2	15.2	15.4
Moldova	14.2	–	14.2
Comoros	–	13.9	13.9
Afghanistan	11.7	2.0	13.7
Jamaica	1.0	12.5	13.5
Trinidad and Tobago	–	13.1	13.1
Samoa	–	10.4	10.4
Bahamas	–	8.6	8.6
Timor-Leste	0.5	8.0	8.5
Serbia	5.8	2.5	8.3
Cape Verde	–	8.1	8.1
Belarus	7.4	0.6	8.0
Equatorial Guinea	–	7.2	7.2
Cyprus	5.7	1.2	6.9
Syria	1.7	4.5	6.2
Austria	5.2	0.4	5.6
São Tomé and Príncipe	–	5.6	5.6
Tajikistan	2.3	2.6	4.9
Slovakia	2.8	1.7	4.5
Bosnia and Herzegovina	4.1	0.3	4.4
Singapore	4.2	0.2	4.4
Switzerland	2.5	1.4	3.9
Grenada	–	3.6	3.6
Lebanon	0.9	2.6	3.5
Jordan	2.7	0.7	3.4
Antigua and Barbuda	–	3.3	3.3
Kuwait	0.5	2.8	3.3
Djibouti	–	3.2	3.2
North Macedonia	1.9	0.4	2.3
Montenegro	1.4	0.8	2.2
Lesotho	2.0	–	2.0
Eritrea	–	1.9	1.9
Saint Lucia	–	1.9	1.9
Slovenia	1.1	0.3	1.4
Saint Vincent and the Grenadines	–	1.3	1.3
Tonga	–	1.1	1.1
Barbados	–	0.9	0.9
Palau	–	0.8	0.8
Saint Kitts and Nevis	–	0.7	0.7
Dominica	–	0.4	0.4
Botswana	0.2	–	0.2
Eswatini	0.1	0.1	0.2
Andorra	–	–	–
Bhutan	–	–	–
Liechtenstein	–	–	–
Luxembourg	–	–	–
Monaco	–	–	–
Mongolia	–	–	–
San Marino	–	–	–
World total (2023)	98,405.0	89,062.1	187,467.1

== Aquatic plants ==
Following is a sortable table of the world fisheries' harvest of aquatic plants for 2005. The tonnage from capture and aquaculture is listed by country. Countries whose total harvest was less than 100,000 tons are not included.

Count	Total	Aquaculture	Capture
Total	16,095,775	14,789,972	1,305,803
China	11,163,675	10,855,295	308,380
Philippines	1,338,895	1,338,597	298
Indonesia	918,366	910,636	7,730
South Korea	636,366	621,154	15,212
Japan	612,635	507,742	104,893
Other	556,200	96,761	459,439
North Korea	444,295	444,295	–
Chile	425,343	15,492	409,851

== See also ==
- List of countries by seafood consumption
- List of harvested aquatic animals by weight
- Ocean fisheries
- Outline of fishing
- Population dynamics of fisheries
- Wild fisheries
- World fish production
