= List of countries by meat consumption =

Average daily meat consumption per person, measured in grams per person per day.

Meat supply per person

This is a list of countries by meat consumption. Meat is animal tissue, often muscle, that is eaten as food.

== Accuracy ==
The figures tabulated below do not represent per capita amounts of meat eaten by humans. Instead, they represent FAO figures for carcass mass availability (with "carcass mass" for poultry estimated as ready-to-cook mass), divided by population. The amount eaten by humans differs from carcass mass availability because the latter does not account for losses, which include bones, losses in retail and food service or home preparation (including trim and cooking), spoilage and "downstream" waste, and amounts consumed by pets (compare dressed weight). As an example of the difference, for 2002, when the FAO figure for US per capita meat consumption was 124.48 kg (274 lb 7 oz), the USDA estimate of US per capita loss-adjusted meat consumption was 62.6 kg (138 lb).

Additionally, the 2002 FAO study was potentially misleading for countries with high levels of meat export compared to their population, as it relied on production data using full carcass mass availability, whereas exports generally contain less bones, cartilage and other things not typically used for human consumption. For example, the FAO (2002) figure for Denmark, which has one of the highest meat export rates compared to its population, was 145.9 kg (322 lb) (highest in the world). More recent FAO figures (2009) have taken the earlier discrepancy into account, resulting in a significantly lower 95.2 kg (210 lb) for Denmark (13th in the world). When further adjusted for loss, calculations by DTU Fødevareinstituttet suggest the actual consumption was 48 kg (106 lb) per adult.

== Meat consumption by country/region ==
Countries by meat consumption per capita per year
Country/Dependency	kg/person (2002) (Note: These are the original numbers reported by the FAO in 2002. They were changed by the FAO in later updates (following the same standardized system they used in 2009))	kg/person (2009)	kg/person (2017)	kg/person (2020)
Albania	38.2	44.1	41.78	47.51
Algeria	18.4	19.5	20.32	18.06
American Samoa	24.9	26.8		
Angola	25	22.4	23.43	23.49
Antigua and Barbuda	56	84.3	74.56	72.05
Argentina	79.7	98.3	112.17	109.39
Armenia	27.7	45.8	41.96	45.64
Australia	108.2	111.5	114.26	121.61
Austria	94.1	102	84.94	87.23
Azerbaijan	15.9	32	33.91	34.08
Bahamas	123.6	109.5	87.93	67.05
Bahrain	70.7			
Bangladesh	3.1	4	4.27	4.04
Barbados	88.7	74.5	87.93	71.38
Belarus	58.6	78.4	81.57	81.47
Belgium	86.1	76.9	54.19	65.78
Belize	74.7	42.5	41.07	41.09
Benin	16.2	20.9	16.82	20.24
Bhutan	3			
Bolivia	50	59.1	81.98	71.40
Bosnia and Herzegovina	21.4	27.9	40.98	36.03
Botswana	27.3	26.2	24.48	24.44
Brazil	82.4	85.3	99.36	77.32
Bulgaria	69.4	53	57.03	58.32
Burkina Faso	11.2	14.8	12.75	12.00
Burundi	3.5	5.2		
Cambodia	13.9	16.6	12.67	12.34
Cameroon	14.4	12.7	12.27	11.98
Canada	108.1	94.3	90.09	90.87
Cape Verde	26.3	46.1	31.93	32.18
Côte d'Ivoire	11.3	13.3	11.22	12.38
Central African Republic	28	33.5	32.13	35.90
Chad	14.3	13	11.56	26.48
Chile	66.4	74.1	86.63	83.17
China	52.4	58.2	61.7	60.60
Colombia	33.9	46.5	57.84	55.91
Comoros	7.6	13.4		
Republic of the Congo	13.3	13.4	39.34	40.11
Democratic Republic of the Congo	4.8	5.3		
Costa Rica	40.4	51.1	51.06	53.56
Croatia	49.9	66.3	75.19	75.30
Cuba	32.2	49.4	60.24	55.48
Cyprus	131.3	78.1	76.87	72.83
Czech Republic	77.3	83.4	80.43	82.79
Denmark	145.9	95.2	76.87	70.83
Djibouti	17.1	23.7	15.39	15.04
Dominica	67.1	68.6	60.49	55.03
Dominican Republic	37.8	53.7	52.03	55.25
Ecuador	45	56.4	46.04	45.22
Egypt	22.5	25.6	28.51	26.29
El Salvador	21.4	28.3	33.54	30.52
Eritrea	7.7	7.7		
Estonia	67.4	59.6	63.43	63.64
Ethiopia	7.9	8.5	7.2	5.40
Fiji	39.1	38.8	41.16	43.85
Finland	67.4	74.8	75.38	76.70
France	101.1	86.7	77.97	83.05
French Guiana	13.2	14.6		
French Polynesia	112.2	101.9	89.68	96.09
Gabon	46	66.4	58.24	59.21
The Gambia	5.2	8.1	7.82	7.82
Georgia	26	25.5	31.97	31.83
Germany	82.1	88.1	80.5	87.79
Ghana	9.9	13.9	13.82	13.73
Greece	78.7	74.8	68.65	71.70
Grenada	97	61	57.15	59.40
Guadeloupe	12.7	13.6		
Guatemala	23.8	28.8	35.7	36.39
Guinea	6.5	8.6	12.04	13.05
Guinea-Bissau	13	16.2	16.39	17.29
Guyana	31.8	39	45.24	45.22
Haiti	15.3	15.6	17.59	17.61
Honduras	24.7	34.3	32.96	33.09
Hong Kong				137.08
Hungary	100.7	76	79.74	79.73
Iceland	84.8	86.2	89.93	91.02
India	3.95	4.32	4.51	6.08
Indonesia	8.3	11.6	12.42	11.70
Iran	23.1	36.3	37.78	35.98
Ireland	106.3	87.9	76.85	76.85
Israel	97.1	96	97.82	97.02
Italy	90.4	90.7	77.52	80.96
Jamaica	56.8	59.1	58.96	58.97
Japan	45.9	45.9	49.34	49.33
Jordan	29.8	42	35.31	37.91
Kazakhstan	44.8	62.6	64.49	64.89
Kenya	14.3	16.7	15.26	15.94
Kiribati	32.1	38.5	29.29	29.96
Kuwait	60.2	119.2	67.46	67.12
Kyrgyzstan	39	36.9	30.21	30.46
Laos	15	21.3	24.63	30.41
Latvia	45.7	61.5	68.72	68.73
Lebanon	63.1	58.8	29.52	23.97
Lesotho	15.4	18.3	27.13	19.89
Liberia	7.9	10.4	18.37	18.27
Libya	28.6	33.5		
Lithuania	49.5	78.2	81.25	81.28
Luxembourg	141.7	107.9	80.08	80.08
Macao				103.15
Madagascar	17.6	14.7	13.24	12.34
Malawi	5.1	8.3	10.96	20.34
Malaysia	50.9	52.3	53.12	52.90
Maldives	16.6	21.6	20.22	20.61
Mali	19	22.2	23.46	23.68
Malta	86.9	84.5	81.1	82.06
Mauritania	29.9	29.7	31.25	31.06
Mauritius	39.6	49.4	50.95	50.90
Mexico	58.6	63.8	67.54	64.88
Moldova	22.7	26.8		38.12
Mongolia	108.8	82.1	87.9	88.38
Montenegro		57.7	76.39	73.01
Morocco	20.6	30.1	34.62	35.12
Mozambique	5.6	7.8	8.28	9.39
Myanmar	10.7	32.1	44.69	58.25
Namibia	34	28.3	31.76	30.53
Nepal	10	9.9	13.79	13.55
Netherlands	89.3	85.5	64.5	75.82
Netherlands Antilles	73.3	91		
New Caledonia	76.6	72.6	73.16	68.61
New Zealand	142.1	106.4	87.95	100.90
Nicaragua	14.9	25.3	30.77	30.82
Niger	11.2	25.6	8.74	12.75
Nigeria	8.6	8.8	7.33	7.15
Norway	61.7	66	67.62	67.47
North Korea	10.8	13.4		13.67
North Macedonia	35.4	40.8		36.62
Oman	49.8		43.34	43.34
Pakistan	12.3	14.7	16.01	16.87
Panama	54.5	63.5	64.67	65.02
Papua New Guinea	73			
Paraguay	70.3	41.9	42.35	54.07
Peru	34.5	20.8	23.78	24.41
Philippines	31.1	33.6	36.6	37.04
Poland	78.1	76.9	88.67	88.71
Portugal	91.1	93.4	90.99	94.07
Qatar	90.5			
Reunion	46.8			
Romania	54.5	64.7	67.87	63.92
Russia	51	69.2	85.95	87.81
Rwanda	4.4	6.5	7.93	9.08
Saint Kitts and Nevis	99.3	70.8	87.31	82.51
Saint Lucia	124.1	93.6	91.82	90.90
Saint Vincent and the Grenadines	79.1	91.4	93.38	91.05
Samoa	82.6	87.2	97.76	96.68
Sao Tome and Principe	9.6	16.5	14.83	14.18
Saudi Arabia	44.6	54.4	49.17	54.13
Senegal	17.7	15.8	15.2	14.13
Serbia		45.2	56	53.49
Seychelles	51.1	35.6		
Sierra Leone	6.1	7.3	8.55	8.23
Singapore	71.1			
Slovakia	67.4	60.4	58.25	59.35
Slovenia	88	88.3	73.14	76.40
Solomon Islands	9.7	11.9	11.75	11.74
South Africa	39	58.6	62.49	60.03
South Korea	48	54.1	55.89	70.71
Spain	118.6	97		100.26
Sri Lanka	6.6	6.3	6.5	9.04
Sudan	21	19.1	20.97	21.39
Suriname	40.3	47.5	44.32	42.40
Swaziland	34.2	26.9	25.75	
Sweden	76.1	80.2	74.04	77.07
Switzerland	72.9	74.7	66.1	67.54
Syria	21.2	22.8		
Taiwan				77.57
Tajikistan	8.7	14.7	14.73	16.47
Thailand	27.9	25.8	28.96	27.37
Timor-Leste	41.3	33.8	31.29	31.51
Tanzania	10	9.6		
Togo	8.5	11.7	12.1	12.58
Trinidad and Tobago	57.8	47.7	75.5	68.66
Tunisia	25.5	25.9	28.45	28.36
Turkey	19.3	25.3	39.97	38.87
Turkmenistan	41.7	58.6	55.73	60.22
Uganda	11.7	11	11.55	9.69
Ukraine	32.3	48.5	48.49	46.92
United Arab Emirates	74.4	73.8	68.59	62.03
United Kingdom	79.6	84.2	79.86	79.90
United States	124.8	120.2	121	124.11
Uruguay	98.6	91.6	93.8	87.3
Uzbekistan	20.7	28.4	35.39	34.41
Vanuatu	32.6	35.4	38.32	36.03
Venezuela	56.6	76.8	36.12	40.94
Vietnam	28.6	49.9	64.68	63.34
Yemen	14.7	17.9	12.51	16.86
Zambia	11.9	12.3	14.19	13.12
Zimbabwe	15.2	21.3	17.61	17.67

- Source: Food and Agriculture Organization of the United Nations (FAO), FAOSTAT on-line statistical service (FAO, Rome, 2004). Available online at: http://faostat3.fao.org/
- Meat consumption per capita refers to the total meat retained for use in country per person per year. Total meat includes meat from animals slaughtered in countries, irrespective of their origin, and comprises horsemeat, poultry, and meat from all other domestic or wild animals such as camels, rabbits, reindeer, and game animals
- Per capita (person) calculations were conducted by WRI using FAO data on meat production and trade, and using U.N. data on population. Meat consumption was calculated using a trade balance approach - total production plus imports, minus exports.

== See also ==
- Vegetarianism by country
- List of countries by seafood consumption
