= New Dusit Zoo =

- Date opened: 2027
- Location: Pathum Thani, Thailand
- Owner: Zoological Park Organization

The successor to the Dusit Zoo is planned to open in Pathum Thani province in 2027. The zoo is located on 300 rai of royal land donated by King Vajiralongkorn in Thanyaburi district.

== History ==
The zoo was originally expected to open in early 2026.

The first exhibits are projected to open in April 2027. The zoo's full opening is schedule for 2029, with the second phase projected to have four continental zones: Asia, Africa, Australia and South America.
