= Ocean fisheries =

An ocean fishery is an area with an associated fish or aquatic population which is harvested for its commercial value. Fisheries can be wild or farmed. Most of the world's wild fisheries are in the oceans.

== Overview ==
Oceans occupy 71% of the Earth's surface. They are divided into five major oceans, which in decreasing order of size are: the Pacific Ocean, Atlantic Ocean, Indian Ocean, Southern Ocean and Arctic Ocean. Over 70% of the world catch from the sea comes from the Pacific Ocean.

Ocean metrics
Ocean	Area million km^{2}	%	Volume million cu km	%	Mean depth km	Max depth km	Coastline km	Fish capture million tonnes	%
Pacific Ocean	155.6	46.4	679.6	49.6	4.37	10.924	135,663	84.234	71.0
Atlantic Ocean	76.8	22.9	313.4	22.5	4.08	8.605	111,866	24.045	20.3
Indian Ocean	68.6	20.4	269.3	19.6	3.93	7.258	66,526	10.197	8.6
Southern Ocean	20.3	6.1	91.5	6.7	4.51	7.235	17,968	0.147	0.1
Arctic Ocean	14.1	4.2	17.0	1.2	1.21	4.665	45,389		
Totals	335.3		1370.8		4.09	10.924	356,000	118.623	

== Pacific Ocean ==
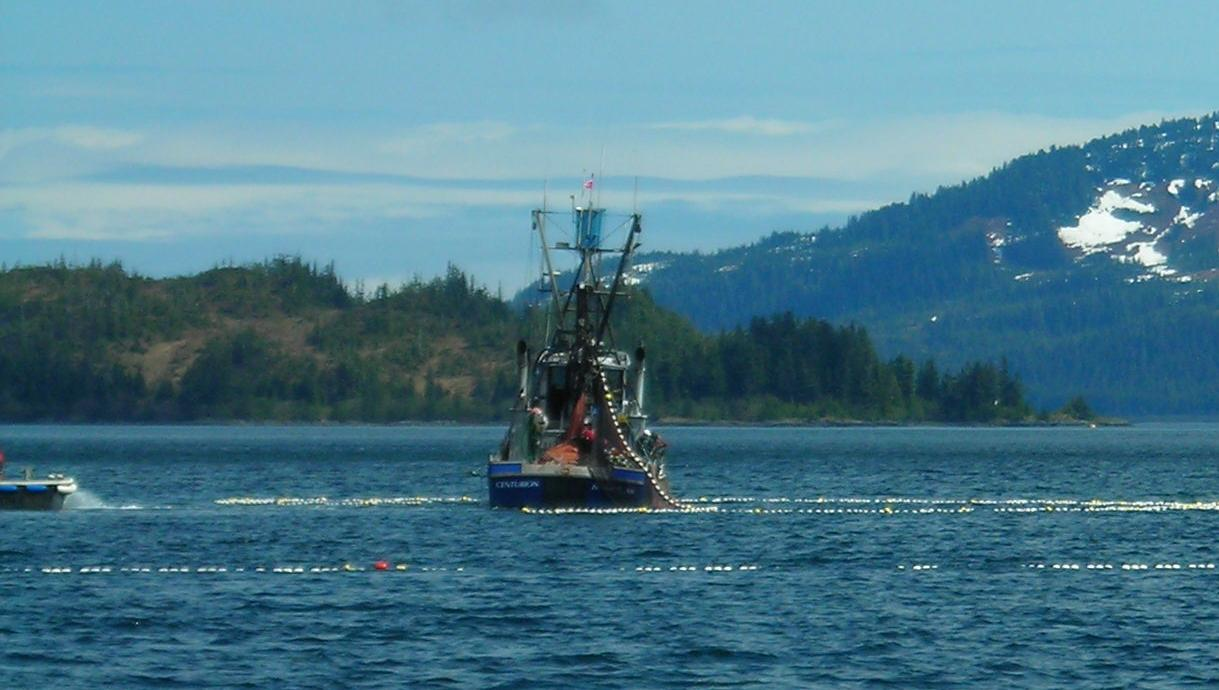
Seine fishing for salmon Prince William Sound, Alaska

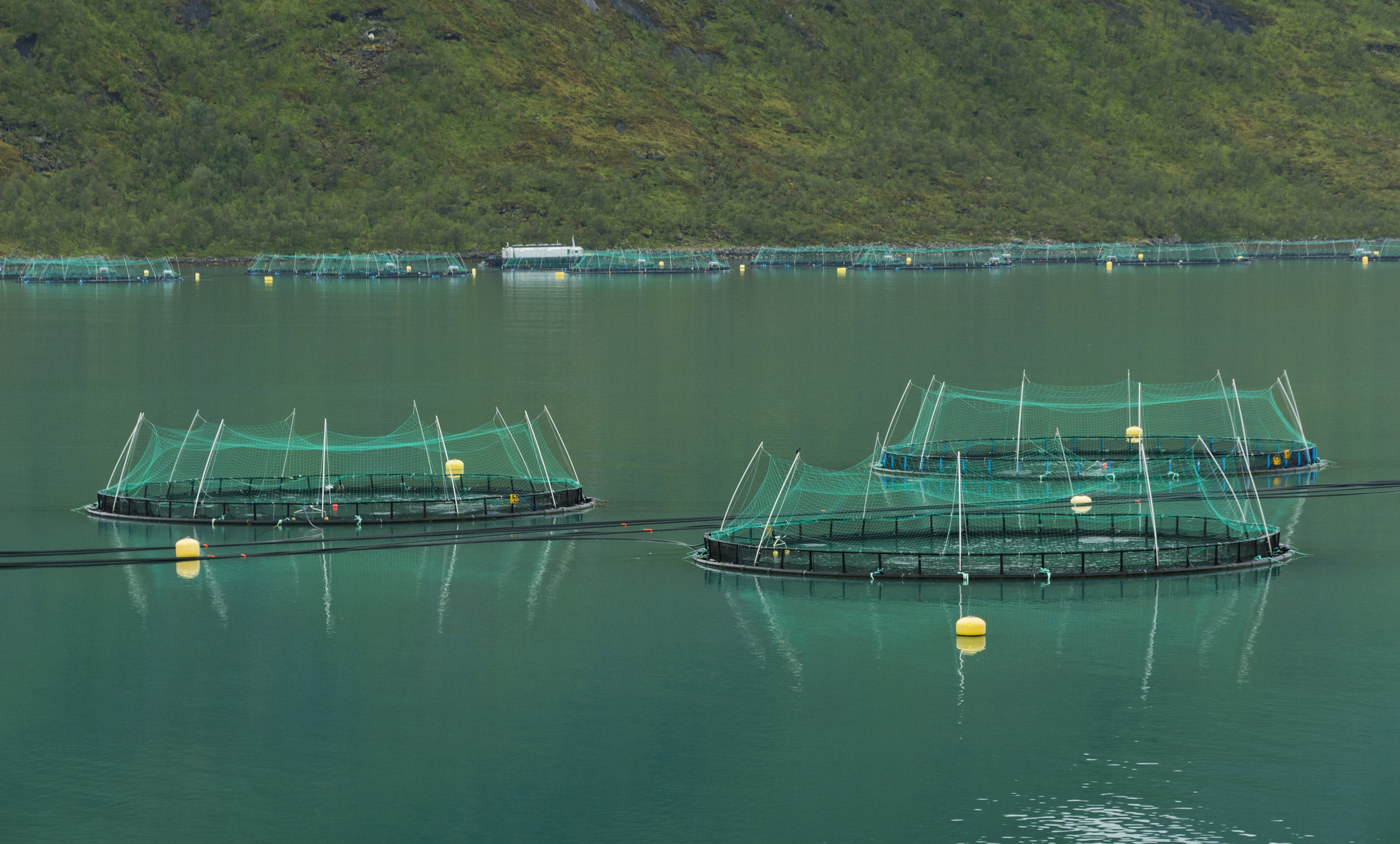
Salmon farming sea cage in Senja, Norway

The Pacific Ocean is the largest of the world's oceans, extending from the Arctic in the north to Antarctica in the south. Covering 169.2 million square kilometers, it is larger than all of the Earth's land area combined. The Pacific's greatest asset is its fish. The shoreline waters of the continents and the more temperate islands yield herring, salmon, sardines, snapper, swordfish and tuna, as well as shellfish. Many seas within the Pacific Ocean are abundant in fisheries resources.

=== Seas ===
The Celebes Sea has warm clear waters and harbors about 580 of the world's 793 species of reef-building corals, which are among the most biodiverse coral reefs in the world and home to an impressive array of marine life, including whales and dolphins, sea turtles, manta rays, eagle rays, barracuda, marlin, tuna and other reef and pelagic species. The sea also yields other aquatic products like sea tang. The Coral Sea is an ecologically important source of coral.

The Sea of Japan has almost no tides due to its nearly complete enclosure. It has an area of 978,000 square kilometre, a mean depth of 1,753 meters and a maximum depth of 3,742 meters. The areas in the north and the southeast of this sea are rich fishing grounds. The importance of the fishery in the sea is well illustrated by the dispute between South Korea and Japan over Liancourt Rocks.

The South China Sea is the repository of large sediment volumes delivered by the Mekong River, Red River and Pearl River. Within the sea, there are over 200 identified islands and reefs, including a 100 km wide seamount with a depth of 20 m and an area of 8,866 km^{2}. According to studies made by the Department of Environment and Natural Resources, Philippines, this body of water holds one third of the all world's marine biodiversity, thereby making it a very important area for the ecosystem.

== Atlantic Ocean ==
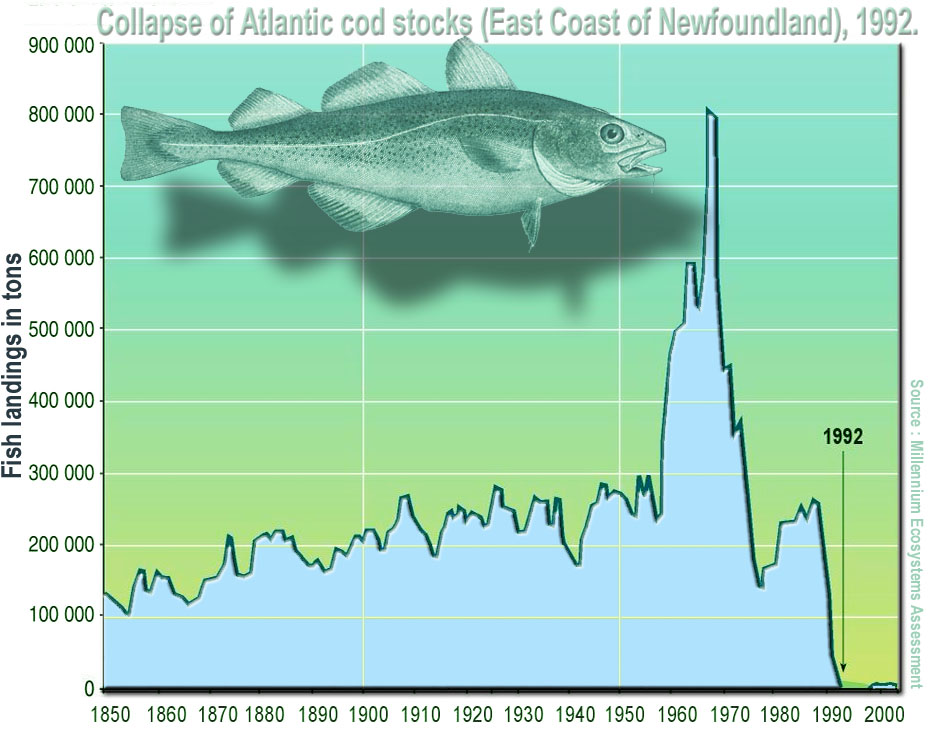
Northwest Atlantic cod stocks were severely overfished in the 1970s and 1980s, leading to their abrupt collapse in 1992

The Atlantic Ocean is the second-largest ocean covering 106.4 million square kilometres with a coastline of 111,000 kilometres. It occupies about one-fifth of the Earth's surface. The ocean has some of the world's richest fishing resources, especially in the waters covering the continental shelves. The major species of fish caught are cod, haddock, hake, herring and mackerel. The most productive areas include the Grand Banks of Newfoundland, the shelf area off Nova Scotia, Georges Bank off Cape Cod, the Bahama Banks, the waters around Iceland, the Irish Sea, the Dogger Bank of the North Sea and the Burdwood Bank of the Falkland Islands. Eel, lobster and whales have also been taken in great quantities. Because of the threats to the marine environment presented by oil spills, marine debris and the incineration of toxic wastes at sea, various international treaties exist to reduce some forms of pollution in the Atlantic ocean.

=== Seas ===
==== Caribbean Sea ====
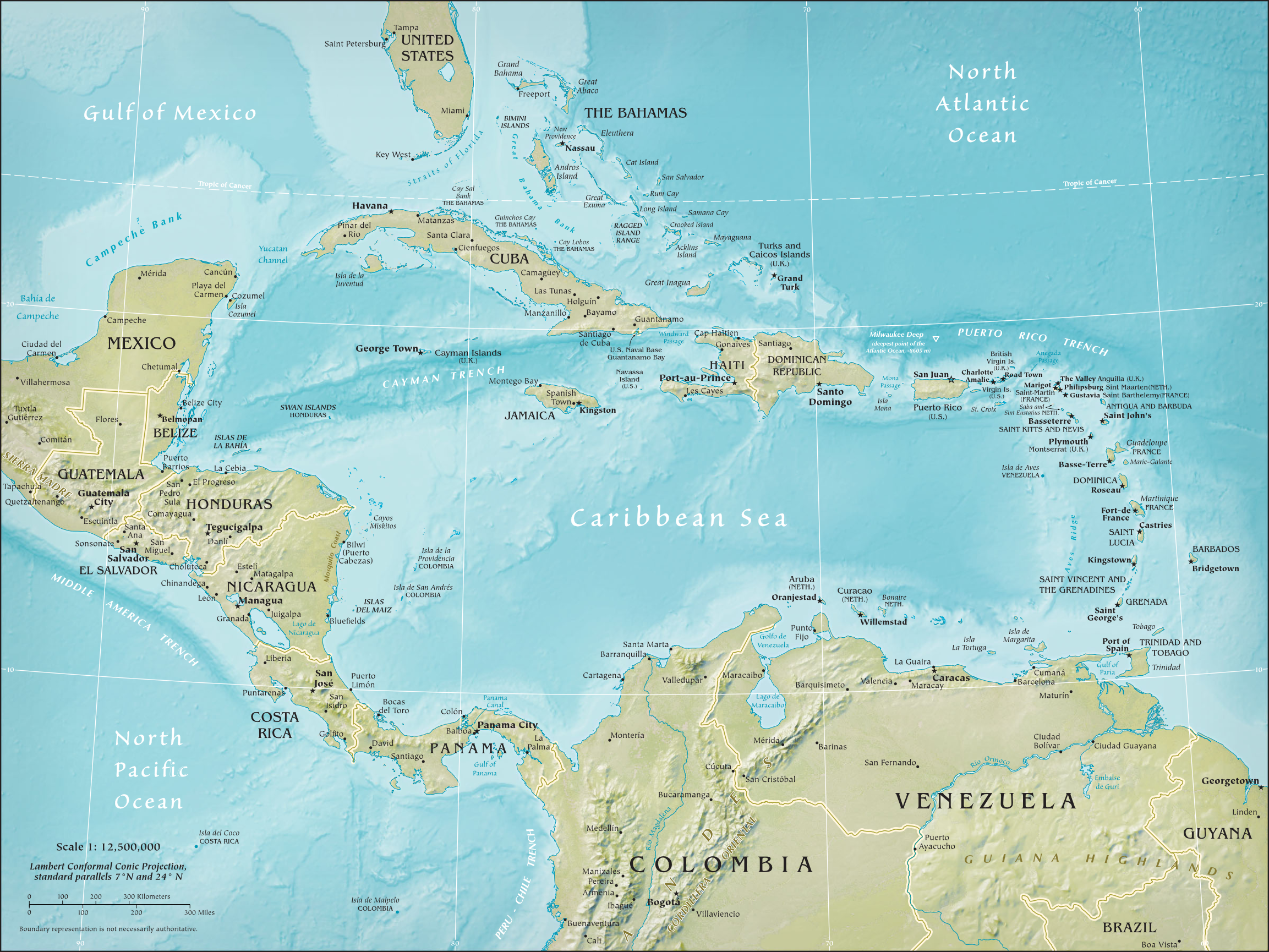
Map of the Caribbean Sea

The Caribbean Sea is home to about 29% of the world's coral reefs. Currently, unusually warm Caribbean waters are endangering the Caribbean coral reefs. Coral reefs support some of the most diverse habitats in the world, but are fragile ecosystems. When tropical waters exceed 85°F for an extended period of time, microscopic plants called zooxanthellae die off. These plant provide food for the coral and give them their color. The resultant bleaching of the coral reefs kills them and ruins the ecosystem. Up to 42% of the coral colonies have gone completely white, while 95% have undergone at least some bleaching. The habitats supported by the reefs are critical to such tourist activities such as fishing and diving and provide an annual economic value to Caribbean nations of $3.1-$4.6 billion. Continued destruction of the reefs could severely damage the region's economy. A Protocol of the Convention for the Protection and Development of the Marine Environment of the Wider Caribbean Region came in effect in 1986 to protect the various endangered marine life of the Caribbean through forbidding human activities that would advance the continued destruction of such marine life in various areas. Currently this protocol has been ratified by 15 countries.The area also generates a large fishing industry for the surrounding countries, accounting for half a million metric tons of fish a year.

The Gulf of Mexico is an important fisheries resource with major catches of red snapper, amberjack, tilefish, swordfish and various grouper, as well as shrimp and crabs. Oysters are also harvested on a large scale from many of the bays and sounds.

==== Mediterranean Sea ====
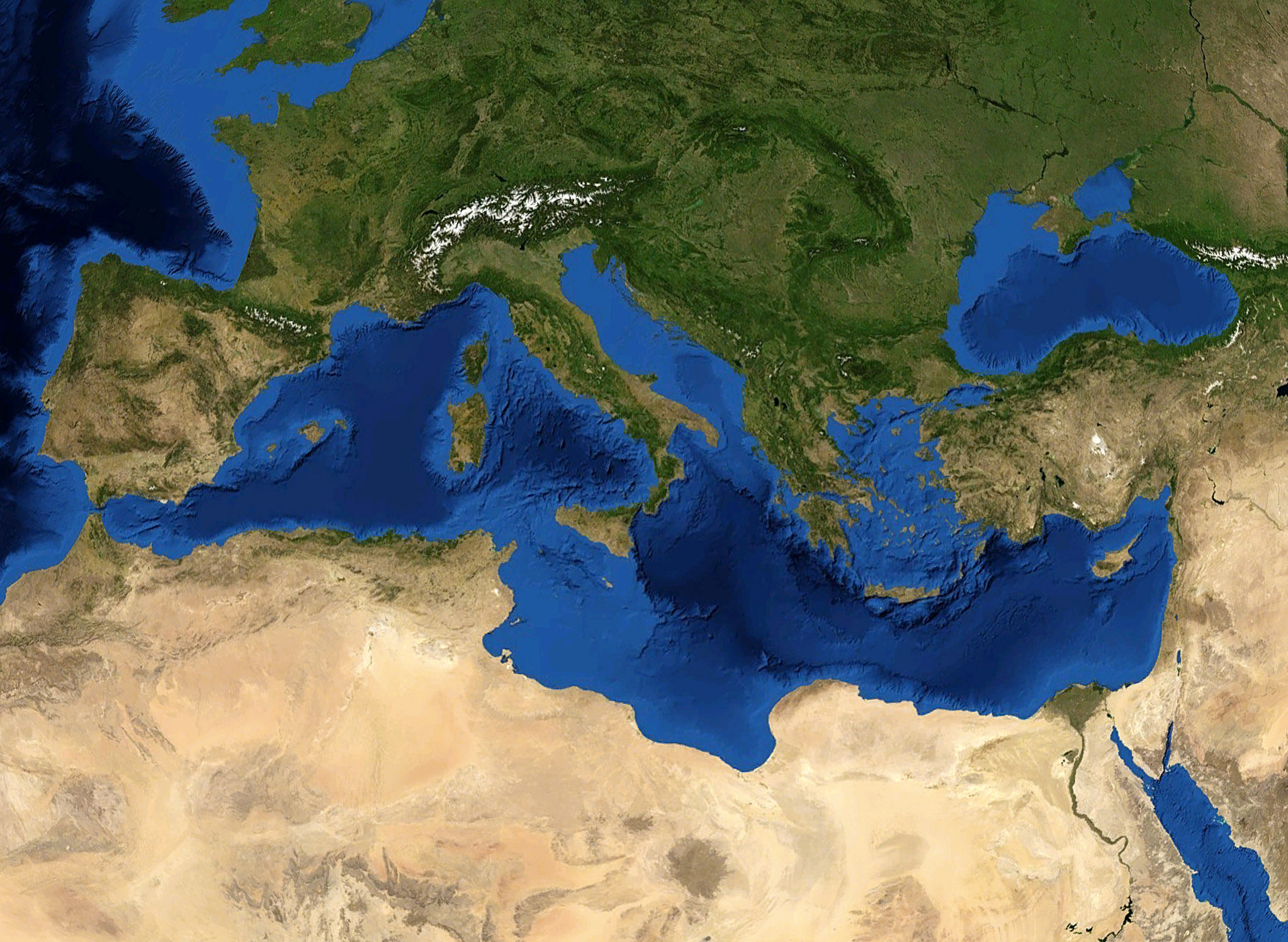
Satellite image of Mediterranean Sea

The Mediterranean Sea has an average depth of 1,500 metres (4,920 ft) and the deepest recorded point is 5,267 meters (about 3.27 miles). The coastline extends for 46,000 kilometres (29,000 mi). Invasive species originating from the Red Sea have been introduced into the sea by the construction of the Suez Canal and have had a serious impacts on the sea's ecology, endangering many local and endemic Mediterranean species. About 300 species native to the Red Sea have been identified in the Mediterranean Sea. In recent years, the Egyptian government's announcement of its intentions to deepen and widen the canal have raised concerns from marine biologists, fearing that such an act will only worsen the invasion of Red Sea species into the Mediterranean, facilitating the crossing of the canal for yet additional species.

Pollution in this region has been extremely high in recent years. The United Nations Environment Programme has estimated that 650 million tons of sewage, 129,000 tons of mineral oil, 60,000 tons of mercury, 3,800 tons of lead and 36,000 tons of phosphates are dumped into the Mediterranean each year. The Barcelona Convention aims to 'reduce pollution in the Mediterranean Sea and protect and improve the marine environment in the area, thereby contributing to its sustainable development.' Many marine species have been almost wiped out because of the sea's pollution. The Mediterranean monk seal is considered to be among the world's most endangered marine mammals. The Mediterranean is also plagued by marine debris. A 1994 study of the seabed using trawl nets around the coasts of Spain, France and Italy reported a particularly high mean concentration of debris; an average of 1,935 items per square kilometre. Plastic debris accounted for 76%, of which 94% was plastic bags.

==== North Sea ====
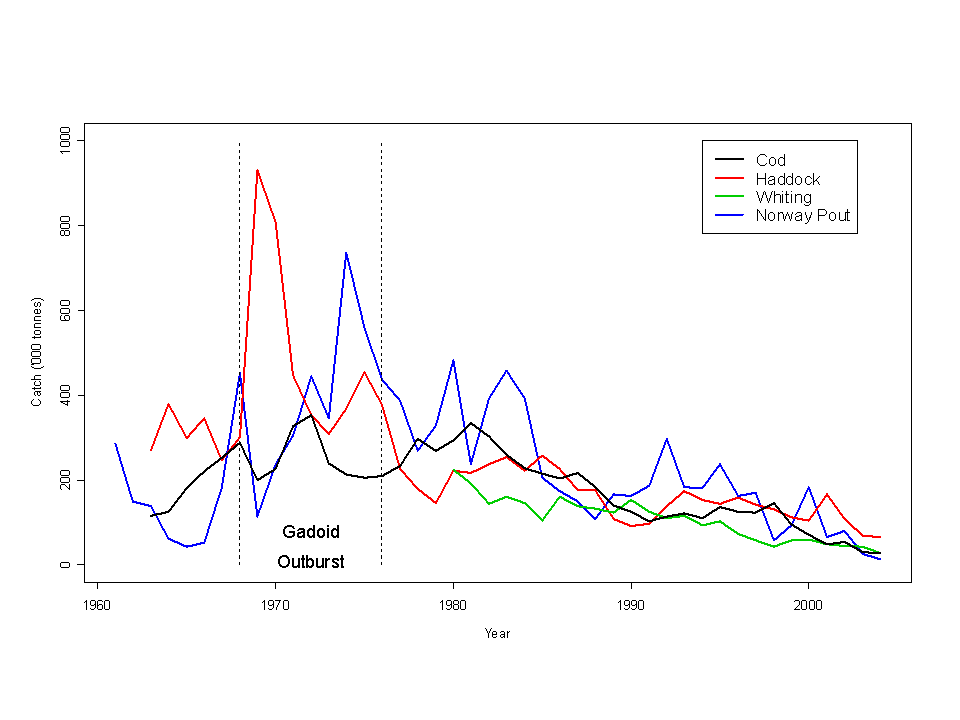
Trends in landings of Cod, Haddock, Whiting and Norway Pout from the North Sea (1961–2004)

The North Sea is a mjor sea in Northern Europe, where a large part of the European drainage basin empties into it including water from the Baltic Sea. Fishing in the North Sea is concentrated in the southern part of the coastal waters with the main method of fishing being trawling. Annual catches grew each year until the 1980s, when a high point of more than 3 million metric tons (3.3 million S/T) was reached. Since then, the numbers have fallen back to around 2.3 million tons (2.5 million S/T) annually with considerable differences between years. Besides the fish caught, it is estimated that 150,000 metric tons (165,000 S/T) of unmarketable by-catch are caught and around 85,000 metric tons (94,000 S/T) of dead and injured invertebrates.

The Norwegian Sea is the source of much of the North Atlantic Deep Water. The region remains ice-free due to the warm and saline Norwegian Atlantic Current. It provides rich fishing grounds, with catches mostly consisting of cod, herrings, sardines and anchovies. Shifts and fluctuations in these currents are closely monitored as they are thought to be indicators for an ongoing climate change.

== Indian Ocean ==
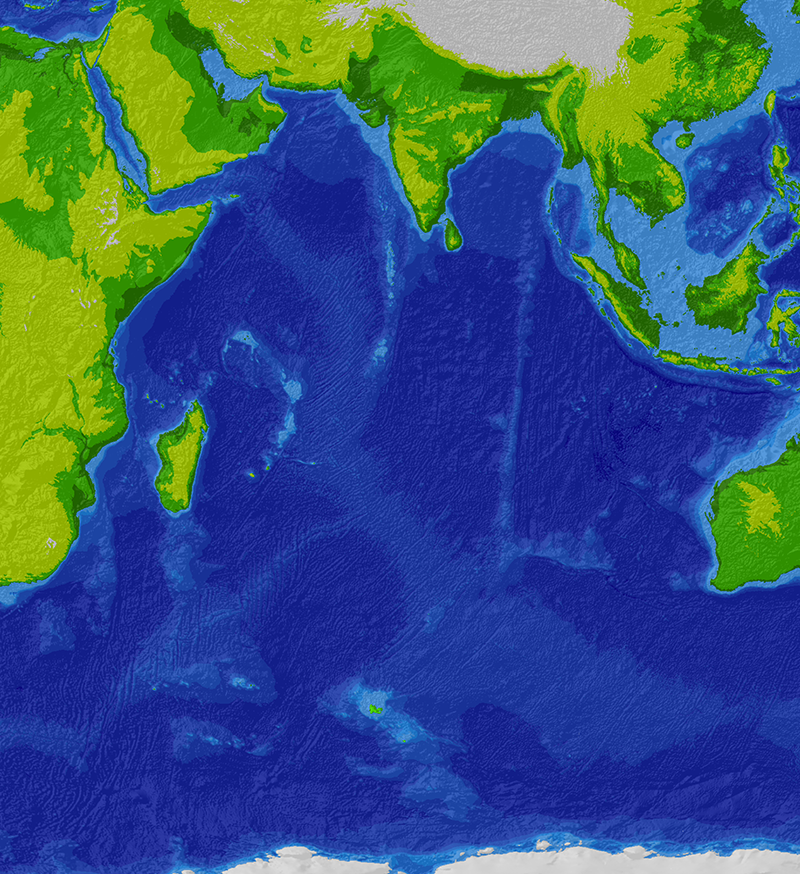
Bathymetric map of the Indian Ocean region

The Indian Ocean is the third largest ocean, covering 73,556,000 square kilometres, or about twenty percent of the water on the Earth's surface. Small islands dot the continental rims. The ocean's continental shelves are narrow, averaging 200 kilometres (120 mi) in width. An exception is found off Australia's western coast, where the shelf width exceeds 1,000 kilometres (620 mi). The average depth of the ocean is 3,890 metres (12,760 feet). The remaining 14% is layered with terrigenous sediments. Glacial outwash dominates the extreme southern latitudes.

The warmth of the Indian Ocean keeps phytoplankton production low, except along the northern fringes and in a few scattered spots elsewhere; life in the ocean is thus limited. Fishing is confined to subsistence levels. Its fish are of great and growing importance to the bordering countries for domestic consumption and export. Fishing fleets from Russia, Japan, South Korea and Taiwan exploit the Indian Ocean mainly for shrimp and tuna. Endangered marine species include the dugong, seals, turtles and whales. Oil and ship pollution threatens the Arabian Sea, Persian Gulf and Red Sea.

=== Seas ===
==== Arabian Sea ====
The Arabian Sea is a region of the Indian Ocean bounded on the east by India, on the north by Pakistan and Iran, on the west by Arabian Peninsula, on the south, approximately, by a line between Cape Guardafui, the north-east point of Somalia, Socotra and Kanyakumari (Cape Comorin) in India. The maximum width of the Arabian Sea is approximately 2,400 km (1,490 mi), and its maximum depth is 4,652 metres (15,262 ft).

The Gulf of Aden lies between Yemen and Somalia, the temperature of the gulf varies between 15 °C (59 °F) and 28 °C (82 °F), depending on the season and the appearance of monsoons. The salinity of the Gulf at 10 metres (33 ft) depth varies from 35.3 ‰ along the eastern Somali coast to as high as 37.3 ‰ in the Gulf's center, while the oxygen content in the Gulf of Aden at the same depth is typically between 4.0 and 5.0 mL/L. A geologically young body of water, the Gulf of Aden has a unique biodiversity that contains many varieties of fish, coral, seabirds and invertebrates. This rich ecological diversity has benefitted from the relative lack of pollution during the history of human habitation around the Gulf, but environmental groups fear that the lack of a coordinated effort to control pollution may jeopardize the Gulf's ecosphere. The Gulf of Aden is an area known for acts of piracy,

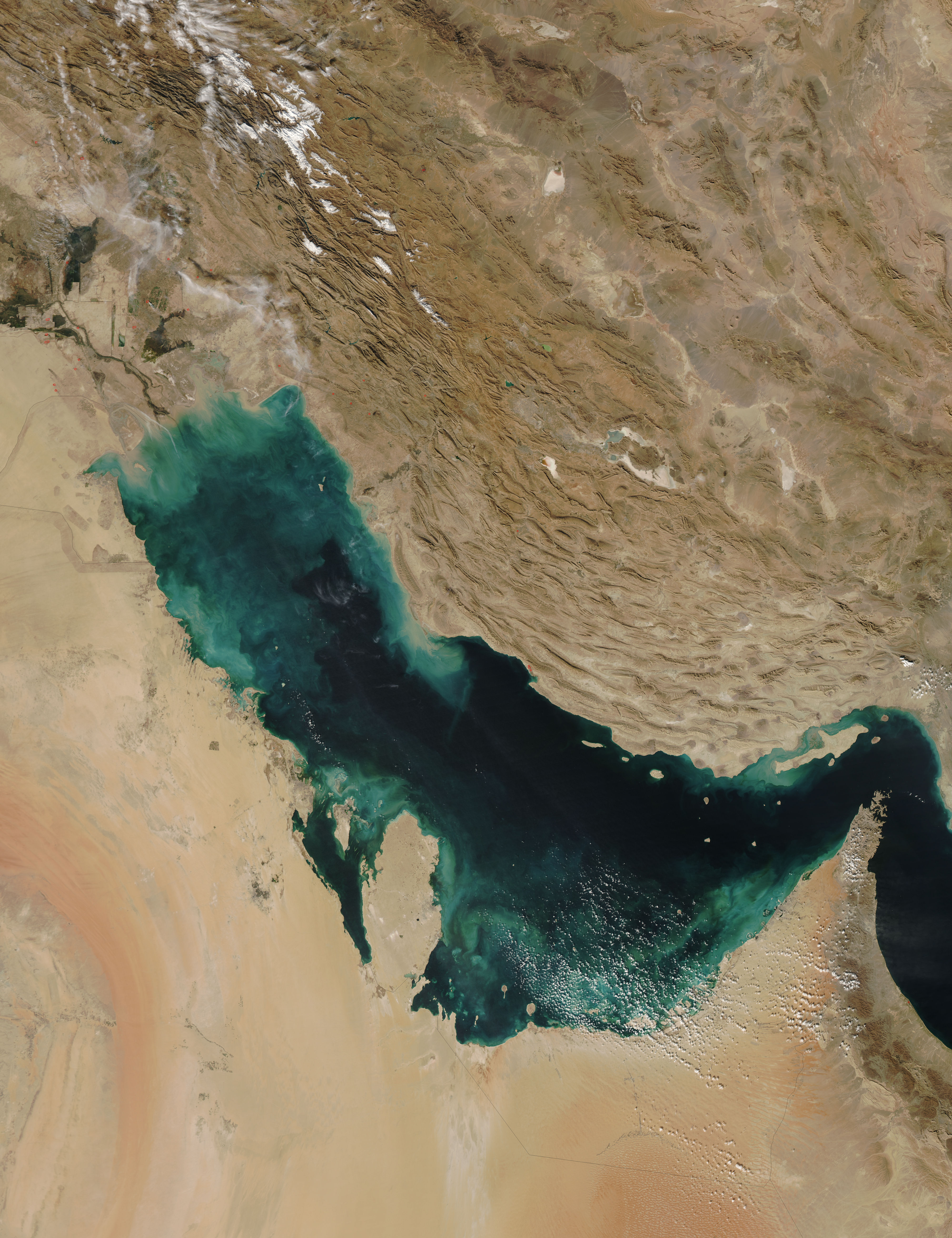
The Persian Gulf

The Persian Gulf is an extension of the Indian Ocean located between Iran and the Arabian Peninsula. The natural environment of the Persian Gulf is very rich with good fishing grounds, extensive coral reefsand abundant pearl oysters, but its ecology has become increasingly under pressure from the heavy industrialisation and in particular the repeated major oil spills associated with recent wars fought in the region.

==== Red Sea ====
The Red Sea occupies a part of the Great Rift Valley and has a surface area of 438,000 km^{2}. It is 2250 km long and, at its widest point, 355 km wide. It has a maximum depth of 2211 m in the central median trench and an average depth of 490 m (1,608 feet ), but there are also extensive shallow shelves, noted for their marine life and corals. The sea is the habitat of over 1,000 invertebrate species and 200 soft and hard corals and is the world's most northern tropical sea.

The Red Sea is a rich and diverse ecosystem. More than 1100 species of fish have been recorded in the Red Sea and around 10% of these are found nowhere else. This also includes around 75 species of deepwater fish. The rich diversity is in part due to the 2,000 km (1,240 mi) of coral reef extending along its coastline; these fringing reefs are 5000–7000 years old and are largely formed of stony acropora and porites corals. The reefs form platforms and sometimes lagoons along the coast and occasional other features such as cylinders (such as the blue hole at Dahab). These coastal reefs are also visited by pelagic species of red sea fish, including some of the 44 species of shark. Approximately 40% of the Red Sea is quite shallow (under 100 m/330 ft) and about 25% is under 50 m (164 ft) deep. About 15% of the Red Sea is over 1,000 m (3,300 ft) depth that forms the deep axial trough. Shelf breaks are marked by coral reefs Continental slope has an irregular profile (series of steps down to ~500 m/1,640 ft)

==== Bay of Bengal ====
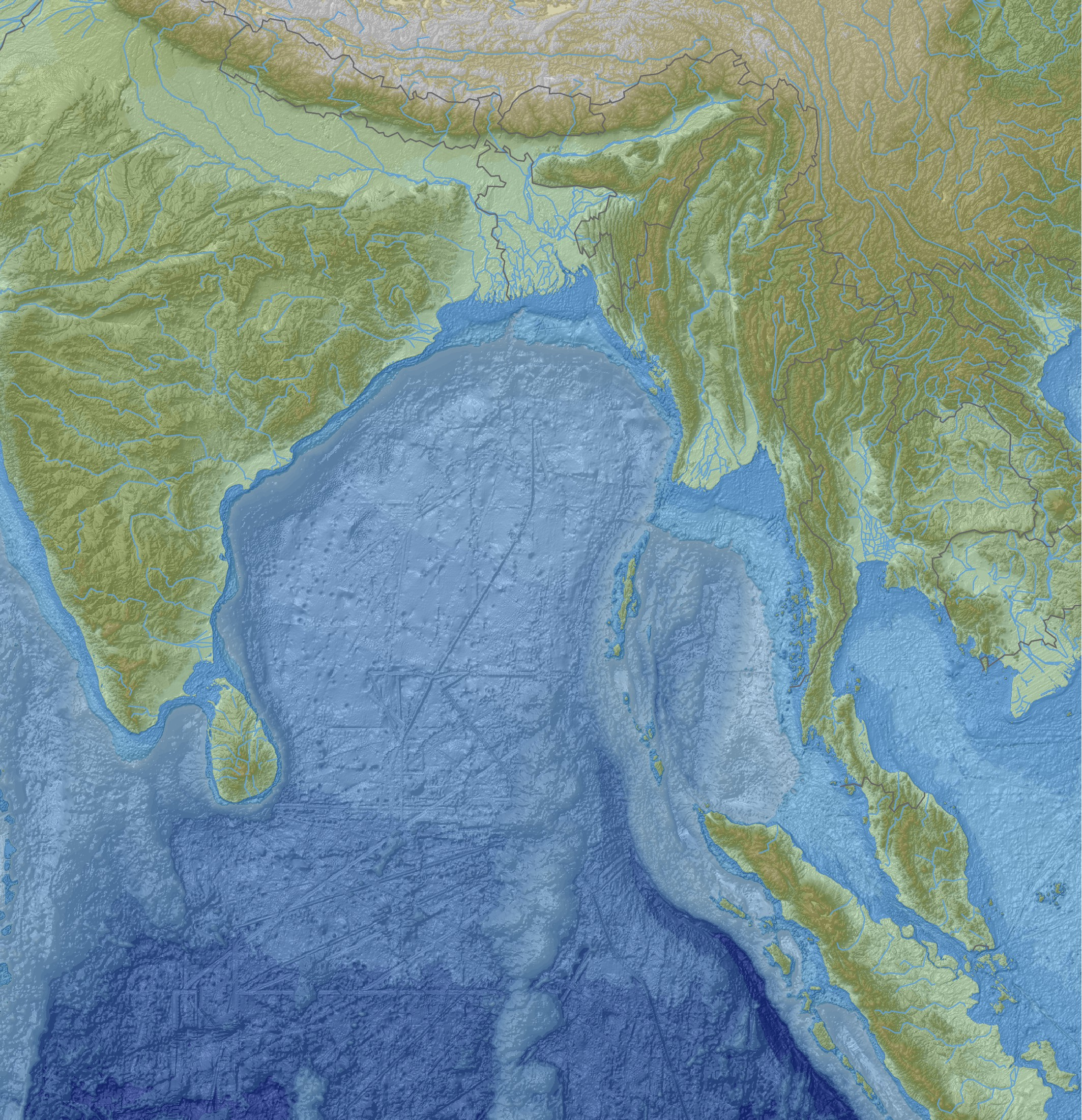
Relief map of Bay of Bengal

The Bay of Bengal occupies an area of 2,172,000 km^{2}. A number of large rivers – Ganges, Brahmaputra, Ayeyarwady, Godavari, Mahanadi, Krishna and Kaveri – flow into the Bay of Bengal. The islands in the bay are very numerous, including the Andaman, Nicobar and Mergui groups. The Bay of Bengal is full of biological diversity, diverging amongst coral reefs, estuaries, fish spawning and nursery areas and mangroves. The Bay of Bengal is one of the World's 64 largest marine ecosystems.

Marlin, barracuda, skipjack tuna, yellowfin tuna, Indo-Pacific hump-backed dolphin and Bryde's whale are a few of the marine animals which live in this bay.

==== Great Australian Bight ====
The Great Australian Bight is a large bight, or open bay located off the central and western portions of the southern coastline of mainland Australia. The waters of the Great Australian Bight, despite being relatively shallow, are not fertile. While most continental shelves are rich in sea life and make popular fishing areas, the barren deserts north of the bight have very little rainfall and what there is mostly flows inland, to dissipate underground or in salt lakes. In consequence, the Great Australian Bight receives very little of the runoff that fertilises most continental shelves and is essentially a marine desert. It is probably best noted for the large number of sharks that frequent its coastal waters, as well as the increasing numbers of southern right whales that migrate within the region. Economically, the Bight has been exploited over many years as part of the fishing, whaling and shellfish industries. Bluefin tuna have been a favoured target of fishing in the Bight.

== Southern Ocean ==
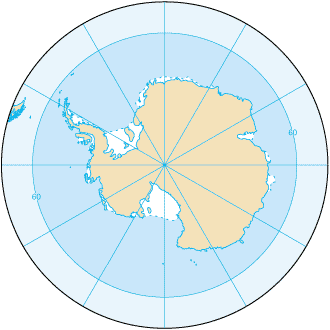
Southern Ocean

The Southern Ocean is the fourth-largest ocean, covering 20,327,000 square kilometers. It is typically between 4,000 and 5,000 meters deep with only limited areas of shallow water. The Antarctic continental shelf is narrow and unusually deep, its edge lying at up to 800 meters, compared to a global mean of 133 meters. The fauna of southern ocean include squid, whales, seals, krill and various types of fish.

Increased solar ultraviolet radiation resulting from the Antarctic ozone hole has reduced marine primary productivity (phytoplankton) by as much as 15% and has started damaging the DNA of some fish. Illegal, unreported and unregulated fishing, especially the landing of an estimated five to six times more Patagonian toothfish than the regulated fishery, likely affects the sustainability of the stock. Long-line fishing for toothfish causes a high incidence of seabird mortality.

The International Whaling Commission prohibits commercial whaling south of 40 degrees south (south of 60 degrees south between 50 degrees and 130 degrees west). Japan does not recognize this and they carry out an annual whale-hunt which they say is for scientific research. The Convention for the Conservation of Antarctic Seals limits seal-hunting, while the Convention on the Conservation of Antarctic Marine Living Resources regulates fishing in the region.

=== Ross Sea ===
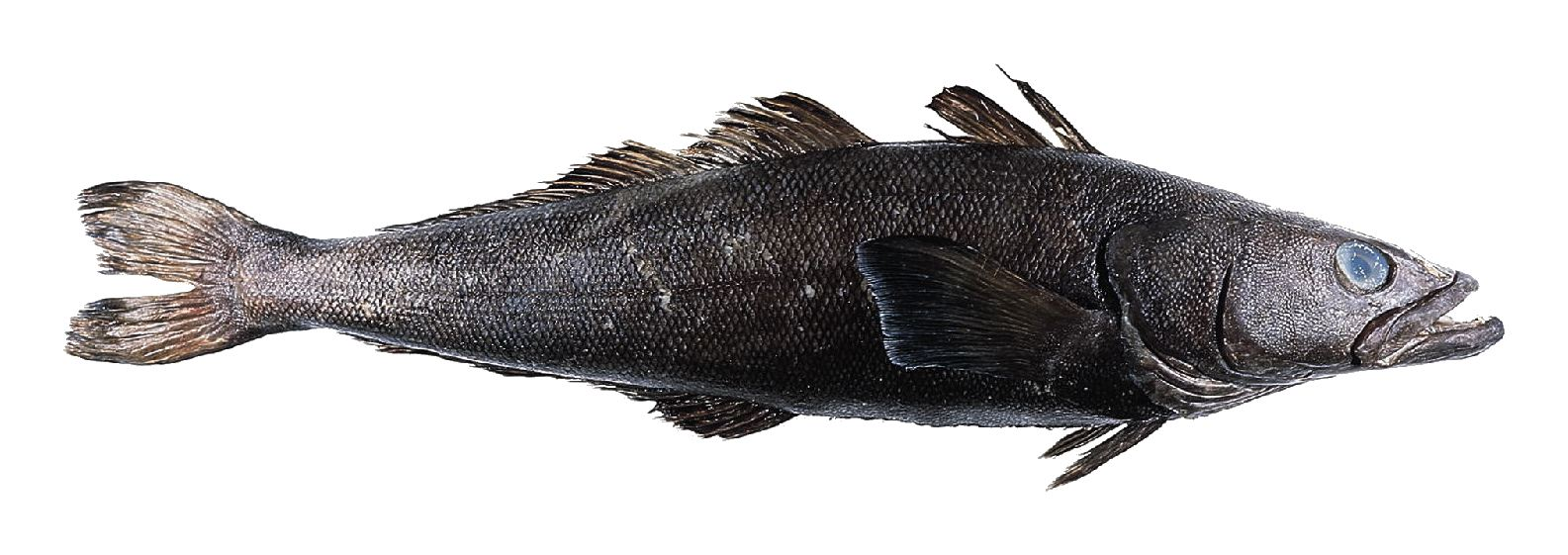
Patagonian toothfish, (Chilean sea bass)

The Ross Sea is a deep bay of the Southern Ocean in Antarctica between Victoria Land and Marie Byrd Land. The southern part is covered by the Ross Ice Shelf. The Ross Sea toothfish fishery is a major fishery. There are two main species of toothfish: the Patagonian toothfish, (Dissostichus eleginoides), which occurs mainly in subantarctic watersand the Antarctic toothfish, (Dissostichus mawsoni), which is found only in antarctic waters. The Antarctic toothfish is caught from the Polar Convergence (at about 60° S) south to the Antarctic continent, whereas the Patagonian toothfish is mainly caught north of 65° S. The Ross Sea region is unusual because between these latitudes both species are abundant and show considerable overlap in their distribution. Indeed, over 90% of the longlines set in the fishery in this area have both species on the same line. Both species are found down to depths of over 2000 m.

The Ross Sea toothfish fishery is the southernmost fishery in the world. During most of the year the Ross Sea itself is covered by ice. However, during January and February, areas of open water (called polynas) allow access to the continental shelf and slope. Longline vessels (predominantly from New Zealand, but also from South Africa, Russia and Uruguay) have taken advantage of this to develop an exploratory fishery. They start working in the deep south and as the season progresses they move north to stay ahead of the freezing sea ice and by May are restricted to the northernmost fishing grounds. The Convention on the Conservation of Antarctic Marine Living Resources (CCAMLR) agrees on annual precautionary catch limits. Since 1998, the catch has steadily increased from about 40 t to over 1350 t in 2002 (all of these catches are well within the CCAMLR limits). Because it is a high latitude fishery, Antarctic toothfish has formed over 95% of the catch. In the 2003 season, up to six New Zealand vessels fished in these waters.

== See also ==
- Wild fisheries
- World fish production
- Fishing by country
- List of harvested aquatic animals by weight
- Population dynamics of fisheries
- Krill fishery
- Crab fisheries

== Sources ==
- World Ocean Atlas (2005) World ocean databasee. Retrieved 19 April 2008.
- The Columbia Electronic Encyclopedia (2007) The World Ocean. Retrieved 19 April 2008.
- Jacques, Peter (2006) Globalization and the world ocean Rowman Altamira. ISBN 0-7591-0585-5
- Eakins, B.W. and G.F. Sharman (2010) "Volumes of the World's Oceans from ETOPO1" NOAA National Geophysical Data Center, Boulder, CO.
