= World fisheries production =

World capture fisheries and aquaculture production by species group

The global commercial production for human use of fish and other aquatic organisms occurs in two ways: they are either captured wild by commercial fishing or they are cultivated and harvested using aquacultural and farming techniques.

According to the Food and Agriculture Organization (FAO), the world production in 2005 consisted of 93.2 million tonnes captured by commercial fishing in wild fisheries, plus 48.1 million tonnes produced by fish farms. In addition, 1.3 million tons of aquatic plants (seaweed etc.) were captured in wild fisheries and 14.8 million tons were produced by aquaculture. The number of individual fish caught in the wild has been estimated at 0.97-2.7 trillion per year (not counting fish farms or marine invertebrates).

== Marine and inland fisheries ==
World capture production 2007 in thousands of tonnes
	Inland fisheries	Marine fisheries	Totals
Freshwater fish	8,695	23	8,718
Diadromous fish	341	1,444	1,785
Marine fishes	82	65,627	65,709
Crustaceans	474	5,367	5,840
Mollusks	383	7,182	7,564
Other	61	388	449
Totals	10,035	80,029	90,064

== Capture production by species ==
The following table shows the capture production by groups of species (fish, crustaceans, molluscs, etc.) in tonnes.

Capture production by groups of species in tonnes
Type	Group	1999	2000	2001	2002	2003	2004	2005
Freshwater fish	Carps, barbels and other cyprinids	616,828	574 405	569 934	616 985	624 333	594 392	648 160
Freshwater fish	Tilapias and other cichlids	636,758	680 004	678 157	662 276	689 661	754 395	753 372
Freshwater fish	Miscellaneous freshwater fishes	5,592,329	5 634 005	5 733 341	5 400 530	6 234 448	6 277 565	6 797 864
Finfish	Sturgeons, paddlefishes	2,851	2 603	2 313	1 908	1 628	1 450	1 333
Freshwater fish	River eels	11,939	16 138	12 374	11 444	10 516	10 746	10 463
Finfish	Salmons, trouts, smelts	913,327	805 154	891 042	809 873	966 097	880 261	1 031 141
Migratory fish	Shads	788,770	860 346	665 284	589 692	524 800	569 160	605 548
Finfish	Miscellaneous migratory fishes	75,921	83 328	75 650	79 538	79 465	68 077	65 817
Demersal fish	Flounders, halibuts, soles	956,926	1 009 253	948 427	915 177	917 326	862 162	900 012
Finfish	Cods, hakes, haddocks	9,431,141	8 695 910	9 304 922	8 474 044	9 385 328	9 398 780	8 964 873
Finfish	Miscellaneous coastal fishes	6,119,412	6 112 189	6 310 904	6 315 752	6 789 732	7 002 006	6 640 784
Demersal fish	Miscellaneous demersal fishes	2,955,849	3 033 384	3 008 283	3 062 222	3 059 707	3 163 050	2 986 081
Pelagic fish	Herrings, sardines, anchovies	22,671,427	24 919 239	20 640 734	22 289 332	18 840 389	23 047 541	22 404 769
Pelagic fish	Tunas, bonitos, billfishes	5,943,593	5 816 647	5 782 841	6 138 999	6 197 087	6 160 868	6 243 122
Pelagic fish	Miscellaneous pelagic fishes	10,712,994	10 654 041	12 332 170	11 772 320	11 525 390	11 181 871	11 179 641
Sharks etc.	Sharks, rays, chimaeras	858,007	870 455	845 854	845 820	880 785	819 012	771 105
Other fish	Marine fishes not identified	10,721,534	10 736 398	10 599 122	10 513 550	9 714 669	9 747 625	9 565 512
Crustacean	Freshwater crustaceans	494,111	563 641	626 407	816 405	366 117	353 446	391 526
Crustacean	Crabs, sea spiders	1,061,042	1 101 880	1 093 256	1 122 414	1 334 001	1 332 932	1 323 616
Crustacean	Lobsters, spiny rock lobsters	229,179	227 950	222 138	225 646	225 793	233 825	231 233
Crustacean	King crabs, squat lobsters	77,644	67 932	46 382	41 853	43 993	36 457	52 064
Crustacean	Shrimps, prawns	3,028,171	3 089 755	2 957 730	2 969 311	3 545 309	3 542 438	3 416 533
Crustacean	Krill, planktonic crustaceans	101,957	114 425	104 216	125 989	117 981	118 164	127 034
Crustacean	Miscellaneous marine crustaceans	1,293,164	1 372 858	1 427 312	1 359 158	449 711	486 249	470 568
Mollusc	Freshwater molluscs	552,452	595 286	628 205	631 444	435 668	427 843	415 105
Mollusc	Abalones, winkles, conchs	121,414	120 190	131 429	112 798	121 844	133 240	120 400
Mollusc	Oysters	158,196	249 675	198 132	185 122	196 424	150 088	166 145
Mollusc	Mussels	207,470	261 635	240 718	224 741	186 062	188 359	143 182
Mollusc	Scallops, pectens	609,418	665 569	702 382	750 445	804 349	790 887	711 342
Mollusc	Clams, cockles, ark shells	841,658	798 069	822 520	799 336	899 362	835 150	705 649
Mollusc	Squids, cuttlefishes, octopuses	3,602,711	3 679 332	3 348 493	3 261 615	3 612 308	3 807 189	3 892 145
Mollusc	Miscellaneous marine molluscs	1,562,141	1 509 752	1 505 608	1 486 114	936 169	988 220	1 049 731
Other	Frogs and other amphibians	1,807	2 328	2 486	2 463	2 917	2 836	2 845
Other	Turtles	1,243	1 010	818	1 444	1 498	408	422
Other	Sea squirts and other tunicates	3,905	3 858	2 427	2 320	2 951	2 496	2 735
Other	Horseshoe crabs and other arthropods	2,397	1 696	1 299	1 387	1 190	519	732
Echinoderm	Sea urchins and other echinoderms	121,567	122 480	107 460	123 955	107 109	115 831	100 063
Other	Miscellaneous aquatic invertebrates	542,659	556 787	475 045	454 572	521 855	278 097	360 679
	World total	93 623 912	95 609 607	93 045 815	93 197 994	90 353 972	94 363 635	93 253 346

== Projected production ==
The following table shows the fish production in 2004 and projections for 2010 and later simulation target years. All figures, other than percentages, are in million tonnes.

	2000	2004	2010	2015	2020	2020	2030
Information source	FAO statistics	FAO statistics	SOFIA 2002	FAO study	SOFIA 2002	IFPRI study	SOFIA 2002
Marine capture	86.8	85.8	86		86		87
Inland capture	8.8	9.2	6		6		6
Total capture	95.6	95.0	93	105	93	116	93
Aquaculture	35.5	45.5	53	74	70	54	83
Total production	131.1	140.5	146	179	163	170	176
Food fish production	96.9	105.6	120		138	130	150
Percentage used for food fish	74%	75%	82%		85%	77%	85%
Non-food use	34.2	34.8	26		26	40	26

== Charts ==
- - wild
    - marine
      - pelagic
        - predator
          - tuna
          - billfish
          - shark
        - forage
          - herring
          - sardine
          - anchovy
          - menhaden
      - demersal
        - cod
        - flatfish
    - freshwater
  - farmed
    - carp
    - salmon
    - tilapia

Commercially important finfish fisheries

Import and export values of fish products for different regions

== See also ==
- Fishing industry by country
- Wild fisheries
- Ocean fisheries
- Population dynamics of fisheries
- List of harvested aquatic animals by weight
