= List of countries by seafood consumption =

Fish and seafood consumption per capita

Historical development of seafood consumption

This list of countries by seafood consumption gives a comprehensive overview that ranks nations worldwide based on their annual seafood consumption per capita. Seafood includes fish and other important marine animals. While national meat consumption correlates strongly with indicators like GDP per capita, this correlation is less intense with seafood consumption. Seafood plays a vital role in some poorer states, serving as a significant source of protein and essential nutrients. Please note that the data presented here is based on the most recently available information, and consumption patterns may evolve.

== Seafood consumption by country ==
Countries (some territories like Hong Kong are also included) are ranked by the available per capita supply of fish and other seafood at the consumer level. It does not account for food loss and waste at the consumer level (like in gastronomy or in households).

Countries by seafood consumption per capita
| Rank | Country | Consumption in kg/person (2020) |
|---|---|---|
| 1 | Maldives | 87.30 |
| 2 | Iceland | 84.30 |
| 3 | Macau | 70.26 |
| 4 | Kiribati | 69.22 |
| 5 | Hong Kong | 65.79 |
| 6 | Portugal | 59.36 |
| 7 | Antigua and Barbuda | 57.12 |
| 8 | South Korea | 54.66 |
| 9 | Malaysia | 53.33 |
| 10 | Seychelles | 52.89 |
| 11 | Norway | 50.57 |
| 12 | Federated States of Micronesia | 48.61 |
| 13 | Japan | 46.65 |
| 14 | Cambodia | 46.65 |
| 15 | Myanmar | 45.85 |
| 16 | Nauru | 44.75 |
| 17 | Indonesia | 44.71 |
| 18 | Samoa | 43.97 |
| 19 | French Polynesia | 43.95 |
| 20 | Barbados | 43.88 |
| 21 | Saint Kitts and Nevis | 43.35 |
| 22 | China | 40.33 |
| 23 | Spain | 40.30 |
| 24 | Vietnam | 39.84 |
| 25 | Saint Lucia | 34.44 |
| 26 | France | 33.64 |
| 27 | Finland | 33.52 |
| 28 | Lithuania | 31.89 |
| 29 | Luxembourg | 31.47 |
| 30 | Sweden | 31.34 |
| 31 | Grenada | 30.78 |
| 32 | Taiwan | 29.75 |
| 33 | Italy | 29.64 |
| 34 | Oman | 29.30 |
| 35 | Fiji | 28.89 |
| 36 | Sri Lanka | 28.57 |
| 37 | Vanuatu | 28.57 |
| 38 | Thailand | 28.48 |
| 39 | Philippines | 28.39 |
| 40 | Solomon Islands | 27.88 |
| 41 | Gabon | 27.86 |
| 42 | Dominica | 27.85 |
| 43 | São Tomé and Príncipe | 27.71 |
| 44 | United Arab Emirates | 27.02 |
| 45 | Peru | 26.83 |
| 46 | Jamaica | 26.42 |
| 47 | Denmark | 26.30 |
| 48 | Bangladesh | 26.27 |
| 49 | Egypt | 25.80 |
| 50 | New Zealand | 25.15 |
| 51 | Latvia | 24.87 |
| 52 | Cyprus | 24.86 |
| 53 | Sierra Leone | 24.70 |
| 54 | Guyana | 24.64 |
| 55 | Israel | 24.43 |
| 56 | Ghana | 24.08 |
| 57 | Laos | 24.01 |
| 58 | Australia | 23.94 |
| 59 | Republic of the Congo | 23.67 |
| 60 | Gambia | 23.64 |
| 61 | Mauritius | 23.51 |
| 62 | Bahamas | 23.42 |
| 63 | New Caledonia | 23.34 |
| 64 | Ivory Coast | 22.80 |
| 65 | Belgium | 22.75 |
| 66 | Ireland | 22.52 |
| 67 | United States | 22.45 |
| 68 | Qatar | 21.98 |
| 69 | Russia | 21.76 |
| 70 | Trinidad and Tobago | 21.75 |
| 71 | Greece | 21.54 |
| 72 | Netherlands | 21.48 |
| 73 | Canada | 20.65 |
| 74 | Saint Vincent and the Grenadines | 20.59 |
| 75 | Malta | 19.57 |
| 76 | Cameroon | 19.18 |
| 77 | Croatia | 19.14 |
| 78 | Bahrain | 18.75 |
| 79 | Morocco | 18.48 |
| 80 | United Kingdom | 18.13 (Note: Valued at about £1.8 million per year in 2018.) |
| 81 | Costa Rica | 17.85 |
| 82 | Switzerland | 16.03 |
| 83 | Suriname | 15.94 |
| 84 | Montenegro | 15.56 |
| 85 | Benin | 15.55 |
| 86 | Comoros | 15.44 |
| 87 | Moldova | 15.25 |
| 88 | Uganda | 14.77 |
| 89 | Libya | 14.73 |
| 90 | Chile | 14.63 |
| 91 | Estonia | 14.62 |
| 92 | Austria | 14.45 |
| 93 | Mexico | 13.95 |
| 94 | Angola | 13.90 |
| 95 | Panama | 13.74 |
| 96 | Ukraine | 13.70 |
| 97 | Kuwait | 13.69 |
| 98 | Tunisia | 13.65 |
| 99 | Mozambique | 13.46 |
| 100 | Papua New Guinea | 13.41 |
| 101 | Belize | 13.35 |
| 102 | Slovenia | 12.97 |
| 103 | Zambia | 12.68 |
| 104 | Germany | 12.66 |
| 105 | Poland | 12.27 |
| 106 | Iran | 12.14 |
| 107 | Senegal | 12.12 |
| 108 | Namibia | 12.11 |
| 109 | Belarus | 11.62 |
| 110 | Togo | 11.46 |
| 111 | Saudi Arabia | 11.35 |
| 112 | North Korea | 10.96 |
| 113 | Czech Republic | 10.64 |
| 114 | Georgia | 10.61 |
| 115 | Lebanon | 10.51 |
| 116 | Cape Verde | 10.31 |
| 117 | Slovakia | 10.21 |
| 118 | Venezuela | 10.18 |
| 119 | Malawi | 10.01 |
| 120 | Guinea | 9.65 |
| 121 | Uruguay | 9.26 |
| 122 | Colombia | 8.88 |
| 123 | Mauritania | 8.72 |
| 124 | Albania | 8.68 |
| 125 | Burkina Faso | 8.66 |
| 126 | Dominican Republic | 8.37 |
| 127 | Ecuador | 8.25 |
| 128 | Romania | 8.23 |
| 129 | Mali | 8.15 |
| 130 | Brazil | 8.06 |
| 131 | Serbia | 7.96 |
| 132 | India | 7.89 |
| 133 | Bulgaria | 7.33 |
| 134 | Bhutan | 7.31 |
| 135 | Bosnia and Herzegovina | 7.19 |
| 136 | Argentina | 6.80 |
| 137 | El Salvador | 6.74 |
| 138 | Nigeria | 6.68 |
| 139 | Central African Republic | 6.66 |
| 140 | South Africa | 6.52 |
| 141 | Chad | 6.51 |
| 142 | Timor-Leste | 6.51 |
| 143 | Nicaragua | 6.50 |
| 144 | Hungary | 6.29 |
| 145 | Tanzania | 6.23 |
| 146 | North Macedonia | 6.13 |
| 147 | Cuba | 6.07 |
| 148 | Armenia | 5.79 |
| 149 | Turkey | 5.53 |
| 150 | Haiti | 5.03 |
| 151 | Jordan | 4.79 |
| 152 | Rwanda | 4.49 |
| 153 | Paraguay | 4.32 |
| 154 | Liberia | 4.27 |
| 155 | Eswatini | 4.21 |
| 156 | Uzbekistan | 4.02 |
| 157 | Democratic Republic of the Congo | 4.02 |
| 158 | Madagascar | 3.89 |
| 159 | Algeria | 3.81 |
| 160 | Nepal | 3.49 |
| 161 | Djibouti | 3.19 |
| 162 | South Sudan | 3.08 |
| 163 | Guatemala | 3.07 |
| 164 | Kenya | 2.98 |
| 165 | Iraq | 2.92 |
| 166 | Lesotho | 2.85 |
| 167 | Zimbabwe | 2.82 |
| 168 | Bolivia | 2.74 |
| 169 | Yemen | 2.73 |
| 170 | Kazakhstan | 2.73 |
| 171 | Turkmenistan | 2.71 |
| 172 | Burundi | 2.53 |
| 173 | Honduras | 2.53 |
| 174 | Botswana | 2.39 |
| 175 | Azerbaijan | 2.01 |
| 176 | Niger | 1.85 |
| 177 | Syria | 1.84 |
| 178 | Pakistan | 1.58 |
| 179 | Guinea-Bissau | 1.14 |
| 180 | Sudan | 1.12 |
| 181 | Kyrgyzstan | 1.10 |
| 182 | Tajikistan | 0.66 |
| 183 | Mongolia | 0.57 |
| 184 | Ethiopia | 0.53 |
| 185 | Afghanistan | 0.36 |
