= List of Mickey Mouse Funhouse episodes =

Mickey Mouse Funhouse is an American animated preschool children's television series created by Phil Weinstein and Thomas Hart. The series debuted with a special on July 16, 2021, and was followed by the official premiere on Disney Jr. on August 20, 2021 and ended on April 25, 2025.

== Series overview ==
Season	Episodes	Originally released	
Season	Episodes	First released	Last released
1	26	July 16, 2021	October 7, 2022
2	30	November 4, 2022	January 26, 2024
3	30	February 23, 2024	April 25, 2025

== Episodes ==
=== Season 1 (2021–22) ===
During the production of this season, Will Ryan (voice of Willie the Giant) died on November 19, 2021. His voice has been used for a while after his death. Before Ryan died, he recorded all his lines for the episodes. After Episode 29, Brock Powell took over the role.

No. overall	No. in season	Title	Directed by	Written by	Storyboard by	Original release date	Prod. code	U.S. viewers (millions)
1	1	"Mickey the Brave!"	Phil Weinstein & Matthew O'Callaghan	Thomas Hart	Matthew O'Callaghan, Phil Mosness & Rossen Varbanov	July 16, 2021	101	0.29
Mickey Mouse introduces the viewers and his pals to his new friend Funny, an enchanted talking playhouse in Funhouse Forest who leads them on adventures to anywhere their imagination can take them. With Mickey and his pals wanting to know if dragons are good or bad, Funny transports the gang to the Kingdom of Majestica, where they encounter Farfus, a dragon who has been causing trouble in the village of Shirehaven as they learn about him from the locals Farmer Pete, Lady Clarabelle, and Innkeeper Cuckoo-Loca. Now it is up to them to head to Dragon Mountain and set Farfus straight.
2	2	"Homesick"	Phil Weinstein & Aldina Dias	Sib Ventress	Tom Morgan	August 20, 2021	102	0.29
2	2	"Goldfish Goofy!"	Matthew O'Callaghan	Kim Duran	Jason Lethcoe	August 20, 2021	102	0.29
"Homesick": The Funhouse Friends want to take Funny on a picnic. They each want to use different Adventure Doors to have their picnic somewhere. Things don't go well when Funny starts sneezing. His sneezes send Mickey and his friends to a desert, an area in Winter Mountain where a Yeti lives, and the Moon. Now Mickey and his friends must find a way to cure Funny so that they can have their picnic. "Goldfish Goofy!": The Funhouse Friends have a pet playdate involving Pluto, Teddy, Minnie's pet cat Figaro, Donald's pet skunk Lil' Stinker, and Goofy's pet goldfish Goldie who cannot join the other pets in certain games. After Lil' Stinker wins the contest to see which pet will spin the Wheel of Adventure Worlds, Funny takes the gang to Underwater Ocean World, where Mickey and his friends are transformed into merpeople while Pluto, Figaro, and Lil' Stinker are turned into fish. When Donald ends up in danger, it is up to Goldie to get everyone to listen to her.
3	3	"Spaced Out!"	Aldina Dias	Mark Drop	Holly Forsyth	August 20, 2021	103	0.29
3	3	"Treasure, Ahoy!"	Matthew O'Callaghan	Mark Drop	Hank Tucker	August 20, 2021	103	0.29
"Spaced Out!": Funny turns into a rocket ship to take everyone into Outer Space as Daisy is weary of traveling into outer space. When a space blob ends up on Funny, they end up pursued by a spaceship throughout outer space when Daisy assumes that their language indicates that they might be hostile, and when the rocket ship lands on Mars they get to meet Martian Mickey & Martian Minnie. "Treasure, Ahoy!": When Donald's impatience causes him to lose his pool floaty, Funny takes the crew to find the Lost & Found Treasure Chest on Treasure Chest Island. This won't be easy as Donald's rushing and a competition with Captain Wheezelene's crew complicate the retrieval.
4	4	"Is There a Plumber in the House?!"	Aldina Dias	Sib Ventress	Tom Morgan	August 27, 2021	104	0.25
4	4	"A Fish Tale"	Matthew O'Callaghan	Sib Ventress	Jason Lethcoe	August 27, 2021	104	0.25
"Is There a Plumber in the House?!": The Funhouse Friends help Funny feel comfortable seeing the plumber Clarabelle Cow when he has a leaky faucet. He sends them on a wild goose chase to Majestica, where he claims that Farfus might help them with the pipes and Winter Mountain, where he lent a tub to the Yeti. "A Fish Tale": When Funny takes the gang fishing at Big Fish Swamp in the Adventure Sea Islands, he warns them about the legendary Big Muddy who is the largest catfish in Big Fish Swamp.
5	5	"Minnie Goes Ape!"	Aldina Dias	Kim Duran	Holly Forsyth	September 3, 2021	105	0.21
5	5	"Dino Doggies"	Matthew O'Callaghan	Kate Moran	Hank Tucker	September 3, 2021	105	0.21
"Minnie Goes Ape!": Following a windstorm, Minnie finds a baby mountain gorilla in Funny who claims that the Adventure Door to the Enchanted Rainforest was blown open. Everyone goes to the Enchanted Rainfores to return the baby gorilla to its parents. They also learn why the location is called the Enchanted Rainforest along the way. "Dino Doggies": After Pluto and Teddy behave themselves during a group picture, Mickey and Goofy take them someplace where they can run around. Funny transports them to Prehistoric World, where Mickey and Goofy are transformed into cavemen. Once there, Pluto and Teddy befriend a baby Triceratops as Mickey and Goofy work to keep them out of danger which also includes an erupting volcano.
6	6	"Troll Trouble!"	Aldina Dias	Thomas Hart	Phil Mosness	September 24, 2021	106	0.33
6	6	"The Sunny Gulch Games"	Matthew O'Callaghan	Norma P. Sepulveda	Rossen Varbanov	September 24, 2021	106	0.33
"Troll Trouble!": King Ludwig of Majestica needs the Funhouse Friends' help to find out why a grumpy troll named Trolland is causing trouble in the kingdom. After every attempt fails, Minnie finds out that Trolland is dirty as Mickey's group works to build a bathtub with Farfus' help. "The Sunny Gulch Games": Daisy insists on playing fair when she agrees to compete in the Sunny Gulch Games hosted by Mayor Clarabelle and refereed by Cowboy Pete. She ends up going up against Wheezelene who does not play fair due to Cheezel and Sneezel secretly helping her pass each of the challenges.
7	7	"Minnie's Big Delivery"	Aldina Dias	Kim Duran	Phil Mosness	October 15, 2021	107	0.21
7	7	"The Wandrin' Warbler"	Matthew O'Callaghan	Sib Ventress	Rossen Varbanov	October 15, 2021	107	0.21
"Minnie's Big Delivery": When Minnie's pizza's toppings are mixed up for her Pizza Perfect Party because of what happened when Goofy went to pick them up, the Funhouse Friends travel to Cheesy Chip and Pepperoni Dale's pizza place in the Land of Myth and Legend and help deliver pizzas to Pete the Mighty on Myth Mountain. "The Wandrin' Warbler": The Funhouse Friends head to Sunny Gulch to hear Wanda Warbler, the best country singer around who has a tendency to wander off. Due her wandering off before show time, Mickey, Minnie, Donald, and Pluto help Mayor Clarabelle to find Wanda Warbler while Goofy and Daisy stall the audience as long as they can.
8	8	"Mickey and the Cornstalk!"	Aldina Dias	Kim Duran	Aldina Dias & Tom Morgan	November 19, 2021	108	0.27
8	8	"King Mickey"	Matthew O'Callaghan	Sib Ventress	Matthew O'Callaghan & Jason Lethcoe	November 19, 2021	108	0.27
"Mickey and the Cornstalk!": Mickey gets the latest issue of "Rocket Mouse" and finds himself unable to find the time to read it. The main reason involves a trip to Majestica. As everyone partakes in a country event, Mickey learns of a magic cornstalk from Farmer Pete which transports Mickey and Goofy to the clouds. Their arrival soon ends up running afoul of Willie the Giant and a giant chick. "King Mickey": King Ludwig summons Mickey and his friends to Majestica. He wants Mickey to be the acting king while he deals with some kingly activities out of Majestica. Mickey works to do every kingly duty as his friends offer to help him. Displeased that they weren't invited to the upcoming surprise feast despite working as jesters, the Weasel Trio work to get to the food there as Mickey struggles to thwart them.
9	9	"Bottled Up!"	Aldina Dias	Kim Duran	Phil Mosness	December 3, 2021	109	0.33
9	9	"Minnie's Fairy Tale!"	Matthew O'Callaghan	Kim Duran	Rossen Varbanov	December 3, 2021	109	0.33
"Bottled Up": With some things not turning out for their activity, Daisy learns about Genies from Funny. When she goes to Razzle Dazzle Dunes to obtain one, Daisy learns that the door she too turned her into a genie as her lamp is found by Trader Clarabelle. Daisy must grant three wishes to Trader Clarabelle. "Minnie's Fairy Tale": The Funhouse Friends go to Majestica and find themselves turned into fairies. Fairy Hilda guides them through their duties in the royal garden so that everything can be made ready in time for King Ludwig, Farmer Pete, Lady Clarabelle, and Inkeeper Cuckoo-Loca to walk through it. As her friends find their special fairy talents, Minnie must find her fairy talent.
10	10	"Daisy & Goofy Clean-Up!"	Aldina Dias	Kate Moran	Holly Forsyth	January 14, 2022	110	0.21
10	10	"Crayon World!"	Matthew O'Callaghan	Nicole Belisle	Hank Tucker	January 14, 2022	110	0.21
"Daisy & Goofy Clean-Up!": Funny is planning on taking everyone to a food fair in the Land of Myth and Legend, a how down in Sunny Gulch, and a snowboarding expedition in Winter Mountain. While everyone goes on without them, Daisy and Goofy's hoedown preparations leads to Funny slipping and creating a mess. They work to clean up the mess on their own, but keep getting distracted by fun things. "Crayon World!": On Art Day, Donald is depressed that his Teddy drawing did not turn out well. During a trip to Crayon World, Daisy is missing the magical magenta crayon she needs to finish her garden drawing. This is because the Weasel Trio are responsible for the missing crayons as they cannot draw well. When everyone ends up trapped with the Weasel Trio using their eraser on everything, it is up to Donald to save everyone and outsmart the Weasel Trio.
11	11	"The Summer Snow Day"	Aldina Dias	Hanah Lee Cook	Phil Mosness	February 25, 2022	113	0.19
11	11	"Sunny the Snowman!"	Matthew O'Callaghan	Kim Duran	Rossen Varbanov	February 25, 2022	113	0.19
"The Summer Snow Day": It is a hot day in Funhouse Forest as Donald and Goofy work to stay cool. Upon Funny suggesting that an Adventure Door might help cool them down, Donald and Goofy make use of the Adventure Door to Winter Mountain as a giant snowball rolls towards them and out into Funhouse Forest. The Funhouse Friends decide to have their own magical snow day by releasing some of the snow from Winter Mountain. "Sunny the Snowman!": Funny informs the Funhouse Friends about a magical snowstorm in Winter Mountain as he takes them there. When the Funhouse Friends build a snowman named Sunny from the magical snow that came from the magical snowstorm, he comes to life as they play with him. Now the gang must prevent their snowman friend from melting when they play at the local village and avoid having Sunny enter a building.
12	12	"Maybe I'm a Maze"	Aldina Dias	Sib Ventress	Tom Morgan	March 11, 2022	114	0.27
12	12	"Land of the Lost... Socks"	Matthew O'Callaghan	Kate Moran	Hank Tucker	March 11, 2022	114	0.27
"Maybe I'm a Maze": Mortimer Mouse accompanies the Funhouse Friends on their next trip. While Donald wanted to go to a beach on the Adventure Sea Islands, Mortimer causes them to follow him into the door to the Land of Myth and Legend. Once there, Mortimer ends up in some hijinks which Mickey has to get him out of. The latest one lands Mickey and Mortimer in Pete the Mighty's maze. If they can find their way to the center of the maze, they will have to take on the challenge of the Minotaur. "Land of the Lost... Socks": Goofy cannot seem to find his socks. To help Goofy out, Funny takes him through the Adventure Door to a location called the Lost and Found Island on the Adventure Sea Islands to see if Goofy can find them there. As they traverse the Lost and Found Island, they follow Goofy's lost sock to a cove where lost socks roam around.
13	13	"Crystal Clear Waters"	Aldina Dias	Kate Moran	Holly Forsyth	March 25, 2022	115	0.20
13	13	"The Big Funhouse Sleepover"	Matthew O'Callaghan	Story by : Mark Drop; Written by : Nicole Belisle	Hank Tucker	March 25, 2022	115	0.20
"Crystal Clear Waters": Celebrity environmentalist Crystal Clearwater is coming to Hot Dog Hills for an event hosted by Mayor McBeagle involving declaring Hot Dog Lake the cleanest lake in the world as Mickey and his friends attend that event. When Crystal Clearwater lands her seaplane, it gets stuck. To help get it unstuck, Funny dispatches his submarine form so that Mickey and his friends can go underwater find out what is responsible. "The Big Funhouse Sleepover": Goofy is hosting a sleepover at Funny as he plans to have it go off without a hitch. Outside of his friends, the other three guests are Trolland from Majestica, Fred the Cyclops from the Land of Myth and Legend, and the Yeti from Winter Mountain. As Goofy does various activities, each one does not seem to be comfortable to each of the Adventure World guests. With help from his friends, Goofy must work to keep Trolland, Fred, and the Yeti satisfied.
14	14	"Ducks Inn Trouble!"	Aldina Dias	Kim Duran	Phil Mosness	April 8, 2022	116	0.14
14	14	"Polka Dots and Don'ts"	Matthew O'Callaghan	Hanah Lee Cook	Rossen Varbanov	April 8, 2022	116	0.14
"Ducks Inn Trouble!": The Funhouse Friends are invited to a pancake breakfast in Majestica. Unfortunately, they are informed by Lady Clarabelle and Innkeeper Cuckoo-Loca that King Ludwig was read a bedtime story that is keeping him asleep. To wake them up, they will need dragon toenail clippings, a peacock feather, and the laughter from the Magic Mirror. While Mickey and Minnie work to get the toenail clippings from Farfus, Daisy and Donald struggle with the peacock feather and the Magic Mirror laughter. "Polka Dots and Don'ts": Funny is holding a party. As everyone prepares for it by setting up, Minnie looks to find a special outfit to wear to the party. Daisy joins her on this mission while doing a side job of inviting people to Funny's party like Clarabelle Cow, Innkeeper Cuckoo-Loca, Farfus the Dragon, Wanda Warbler, Pete the Mighty, Martian Mickey, and Martian Minnie.
15	15	"The Mighty Goof!"	Aldina Dias	Sib Ventress	Tom Morgan & Melissa Suber	April 29, 2022	117	0.18
15	15	"Playtime in Crayon World"	Matthew O'Callaghan	Nicole Belisle	Jason Lethcoe	April 29, 2022	117	0.18
"The Mighty Goof!": Funny takes the Funhouse Friends to the sports-themed world of Sportstopia to play baseball with the Pete's Palookas baseball team led by Powerhouse Pete. The baseball bat that Goofy wields helps out during the turn. Unfortunately, it is starting to break due to the fact that it was pecked by a woodpecker that followed them to Sportstopia. "Playtime in Crayon World": Mickey, Minnie, and friends cannot agree on what game to play. Each one tries to do their game on their own which goes comically awry. Now Minnie must find a way to combine the games to make it entertaining.
16	16	"The Music of the Seasons"	Aldina Dias	Kate Moran	Holly Forsyth	May 13, 2022	118	0.18
16	16	"Mermaids to the Rescue"	Matthew O'Callaghan	Jorjeana Marie	Hank Tucker	May 13, 2022	118	0.18
"The Music of the Seasons": Minnie and Daisy discover a group of gnomes named Pumpkin, Olive and Fig whose magical music welcomes new seasons. "Mermaids to the Rescue": Octo-Pete invites Mickey and his friends to the Big Seahorsey Show in Underwater Ocean World involving the seahorses Seabiscuit and Bubbles.
17	17	"Festival of Heroes!"	Matthew O'Callaghan	Kim Duran	Rossen Varbanov	June 3, 2022	119	0.09
17	17	"I Wander Where the Warbler Went?"	Aldina Dias	Sib Ventress	Phil Mosness & Melissa Suber	June 3, 2022	119	0.09
"Festival of Heroes": The Land of Myth and Legend celebrates its Festival of Heroes attended by the Unstoppable Unicorn, the Groovy Griffin, the Magnificent Minotaur, and Pete the Mighty. The Funhouse Friends are in attendance. When Shepherd Sam reveals that he heard some wolves planning to take his golden sheep Mamie, Pete the Mighty reluctantly takes the job since the other heroes don't want the job. Mickey finds out that Pete the Mighty is afraid of wolves as Mickey's friends help out around Shepherd Sam's farm. What they don't know is that the wolves are actually the Weasel Trio in disguise and that they want the golden wool for their own plans. "I Wander Where the Warbler Went?": As Mayor Clarabelle has Wanda Warbler prepare for Amateur Night in Sunny Gulch, Cheezel and Sneezel plan to get her away from Sunny Gulch. Finding a map left for her, Wanda calls in Mickey and his friends to Sunny Gulch as Mayor Clarabelle instructs them to keep Wanda from wandering away. They work to do that as Cheezel and Sneezel work to separate her from Mickey and get her to Wheezelene.
18	18	"The Fantabulous Five (Plus One)!"	Aldina Dias	Sib Ventress	Tom Morgan	June 24, 2022	120	0.21
18	18	"Mickey Meets Rocket Mouse!"	Matthew O'Callaghan	Kim Duran	Jason Lethcoe	June 24, 2022	120	0.21
"The Fantabulous Five (Plus One)!": To see what it is like to be superheroes, the Funhouse Friends are taken by Funny to the superhero world of Herotropolis. They learn what their powers are and get their superhero codenames from the superhero Captain Clarabelle as they form the Fantabulous Five + 1. Wanting to have superpowers of his own, local scientist Ludwig Von Drake invents a supersuit that goes berserk and steals everyone's powers. "Mickey Meets Rocket Mouse!": Mickey Mouse gets the latest issue of the "Rocket Mouse" books. He soon receives an invitation from Rocket Mouse himself to come to Outer Space. Once there, the Funhouse Friends are enlisted by Rocket Mouse to help set up a lunar base on the Moon. As they do that, they are also told to beware of his enemy Cosmo Cockroach who is known for taking things that don't belong to him.
19	19	"Batteries Included"	Aldina Dias	Kate Moran	Phil Mosness	July 22, 2022	121	0.12
19	19	"Mickey and Minnie: On Ice!"	Matthew O'Callaghan	Hanah Lee Cook	Rossen Varbanov	July 22, 2022	121	0.12
"Batteries Included": The Funhouse Friends head to Halloweenville, where Mayor Franken-Pete is going to be putting on a show at the Magic Mansion. Unfortunately, Mayor Franken-Pete's batteries are drained. As Mickey and his rest of his friends work to get Mayor Franken-Pete to the Magic Mansion, Minnie accompanies Kooky Scientist Ludwig Von Drake to Werewolf Mountain to harness the lightning from a storm there. When the storm dissipates, Minnie contacts Funny to find a portal to the Land of Myths and Legends so that they can have Pete the Mighty use his lightning to recharge the batteries. "Mickey and Minnie: On Ice!": The Funhouse Friends go to Winter Mountain to take part in its winter games as Chip, Dale, and the Weasel Trio are getting involved in. While their friends partake in the different sports, Mickey and Minnie work to find the right winter sports to compete in which leads to them partaking in ice skating.
20	20	"Rain, Rain, Go Away"	Aldina Dias	Sib Ventress	Tom Morgan	August 12, 2022	123	0.12
20	20	"Donald's Razzle Dazzle Deal!"	Matthew O'Callaghan	Kim Duran	Jason Lethcoe	August 12, 2022	123	0.12
"Rain, Rain, Go Away": It is raining in the Funhouse Forest as the Funhouse Friends travel to Majestica to avoid it. Upon arrival, they find that it is warm and there wasn't any rain for days. With Farmer Pete's cornstalks dried out, Funny enlists Farfus to take the Funhouse Friends to Majestica's Cloud Kingdom to see if Willie the Giant knows why it hasn't rained only to discover he has been using all the rain for his garden to grow the largest onion for his onion soup. "Donald's Razzle Dazzle Deal!": On Razzle Dazzle Day in the Razzle Dazzle Dunes, the Funhouse Friends compete in three games with Trader Clarabelle. These games include a magic carpet race, a shopping-themed scavenger hunt, and a camel ride through a maze. After crashing in the Cave of Treasures, Donald finds a lamp containing a genie named Jen and makes a wish to win all the games and prizes. Though this wish ends up taking the fun out of the games for him.
21	21	"Pirate Adventure!"	Aldina Dias & Matthew O'Callaghan	Story by : Thomas Hart; Written by : Mark Drop	Jason Lethcoe, Tom Morgan & Melissa Suber	August 19, 2022	126	0.19
Captain Salty Bones invites the Funhouse Friends to join the biggest treasure hunt ever and see if they can become true pirates. They end up in a competition with Captain Wheezelene and her pirate crew as they go through different challenges like trying to cross the beach on Burping Geyser Beach Island, riding Big Muddy on Big Swamp Island, and crossing a rickety bridge.
22	22	"Daisy and the Muses"	Aldina Dias	Hanah Lee Cook	Holly Forsyth	September 2, 2022	124	0.22
22	22	"Keep on the Ball"	Matthew O'Callaghan	Sib Ventress	Hank Tucker	September 2, 2022	124	0.22
"Daisy and the Muses": Daisy finds that everyone is whistling while drawing with Funny and finds that she cannot whistle. Her friends work to teach her how to whistle. Funny tells Daisy that the Muses in the Land of Myth and Legend can teach her. Upon arrival, they head to the Temple of the Muses, where they meet Calliope and Thalia. They do different talents to see if Daisy can pull off a successfully whistle. "Keep on the Ball": It is a restful day in Funhouse Forest as the Funhouse Friends find themselves resting too long. To remedy this, they get some exercising in by going to Sportstopia. Upon arrival, the Funhouse Friends find that Sportstopia is not bustling as they learn from Clarabelle and Powerhouse Pete that everyone is taking a "time out" from their activities after Referee Cuckoo-Loco hasn't blown "time in" yet. It is soon discovered that Champion Chip and Dynamo Dale have stolen her whistle and now they have to help Referee Cuckoo Loca reclaim her whistle.
23	23	"Farfus' Family!"	Aldina Dias	Kim Duran	Phil Mosness	September 9, 2022	125	0.15
23	23	"The Adventure Parade"	Matthew O'Callaghan	Hanah Lee Cook	Rossen Varbanov	September 9, 2022	125	0.15
"Farfus' Family!": Arriving at Funny, the Funhouse Friends are told by Funny that today is Family Day in Majestica. They head to Majestica to partake in its activities. Upon arrival, they run into Farfus. They follow Farfus to the forest to go meet with Farfus' family and bring them to the Family Day Fair only to find that where his family lives is not there. The Funhouse Friends help Farfus to look for their home. They discover that the home has been moved to Farfus' favorite mountain, where they meet the fairies who adopted him named Gus, Grace, and Gertie. They have also adopted a newly-hatched griffin named Frannie. "The Adventure Parade": The Funhouse Friends meet with Funny and Tedd for the Adventure Parade that will go down Funhouse Forest Lane. Funny states that the float will represent the person as he advises the Funhouse Friends to work together on it. Of course everyone starts getting different ideas. When it comes to the other Adventure Parade floats, Pete the Mighty, the Muses, and the Minotaur set up a labyrinth float to represent the Land of Myths and Legends, Rocket Mouse has set up an Outer Space float to commemorate his different adventures, and King Ludwig, Innkeeper Cuckoo-Loca, and the Royal Troubadour have set up a miniature Shirehaven float to represent Majestica.
24	24	"The Magic Mansion"	Aldina Dias	Jorjeana Marie	Tom Morgan	September 26, 2022	111	0.15
24	24	"Funny's Road Trip!"	Matthew O'Callaghan	Sib Ventress	Jason Lethcoe	September 26, 2022	111	0.15
"The Magic Mansion": The Great Goofini tries a new magic trick using Daisy's favorite stuffed animal. When it does not reappear, the Great Goofini takes everyone to the Magic Mansion in Halloweenville to find the closet it is in as they encounter the magician Trickini. "Funny's Road Trip!": Funny wants an adventure at Zany Mulaney Land, the new amusement park. Upon taking the form of a bus with Teddy taking the form of an attachment, Funny takes the Funhouse Friends on a road trip as different setbacks occur along the way.
25	25	"Fifty-Foot Pluto!"	Aldina Dias	Kate Moran	Holly Forsyth	September 29, 2022	112	0.21
25	25	"A Big Giant Problem!"	Matthew O'Callaghan	Kim Duran	Hank Tucker	September 29, 2022	112	0.21
"Fifty-Foot Pluto!": On Halloween, the Funhouse Friends decorate Funny for Halloween as the wind picks up due to an approaching rainstorm. They get a call from Squeakers the Bat who states that they are needed in Halloweenville to help Mayor Franken-Pete in the Spooky Pumpkin Festival as everyone is getting ready for the contest. While trying to help the Funhouse Friends get ready by getting the pumpkins, Pluto accidentally breaks the cart as Funny suggests that they enlist Kooky Scientist Von Drake to fix it as he is enlarged by accidentally by his giganticator ray. Now they must get stop a runaway pumpkins and get Pluto back to his normal size. "A Big Giant Problem!": Minnie flies her new kite outside of Funny as she shows Mickey a trick. As Mickey holds on to the kite while Minnie is getting lemonade, the wind picks up causing Minnie's kite to get stuck in the tree as he accidentally breaks it. As Windy watches the kite, Willie the Door knocks on Majestica's Adventure Door wanting their help fixing the wagon for the barn dance. As Mickey states to Willie that they will tell Minnie about the kite after helping the wagon, the Funhouse Friends learn that he borrowed the wagon that he broke from his friend Annie the Giant. This causes Mickey and Willie to be weary about informing their friends about what happened to their items as they work on the courage to apologize to them.
26	26	"Welcome to Giant Crab Island!"	Aldina Dias	Hanah Lee Cook	Holly Forsyth	October 7, 2022	122	0.18
26	26	"Ghosts of Haunted Gulch"	Matthew O'Callaghan	Story by : Mark Drop; Written by : Nicole Belisle	Hank Tucker	October 7, 2022	122	0.18
"Welcome to Giant Crab Island!": The Funhouse Friends explore Giant Crab Island in the Adventure Sea Islands. They meet its friendly resident Cora the Giant Crab who gives them a tour of Giant Crab Island while advising them to stay together. When it is getting late, Cora wants to continue the tour and Goofy is into it as they work to take the steering wheel from the pirate ship. "Ghosts of Haunted Gulch": The Funhouse Friends get a call from Mayor Clarabelle who needs help clearing three ghosts out of Sunny Gulch during the start of the annual Frontier Days. Mayor Clarabelle states that she never saw ghosts in Sunny Gulch before. The ghosts even bothered the Weasel Trio during their performance and possessing the piano at Hilda's café. The Funhouse Friends and Mayor Clarabelle encounter the ghosts who came from Halloweenville as Mickey advises Mayor Clarabelle to talk to the ghosts.

=== Season 2 (2022–24) ===
This is the final season where Will Ryan voices Willie the Giant, and the first season that Brock Powell takes over Ryan's role.

No. overall	No. in season	Title	Directed by	Written by	Storyboard by	Original release date	Prod. code	U.S. viewers (millions)
27	1	"The Enchanted Tea Party!"	Aldina Dias	Kim Duran	Holly Forsyth	November 4, 2022	201	0.18
27	1	"Unhappy Campers"	Matthew O'Callaghan	Sib Ventress	Hank Tucker	November 4, 2022	201	0.18
"The Enchanted Tea Party!": The Funhouse Friends go to the Enchanted Rainforest to have a tea party with Pinky the Gorilla. Though Goofy and Daisy argue over which would be the right spot for it. "Unhappy Campers": The Funhouse Friends go camping in the Funhouse Forest when Pumpkin, Olive and Fig are playing music nearby for an upcoming event. After disturbing a raccoon at a campsite, Mickey and the gang learn the importance of respecting others' space.
28	2	"Heroes Clean-Up!"	Aldina Dias	Hanah Lee Cook	Phil Mosness, Melissa Suber & Rossen Varbanov	November 11, 2022	202	0.12
28	2	"Dino Duck!"	Matthew O'Callaghan	Kate Moran	Rossen Varbanov	November 11, 2022	202	0.12
"Heroes Clean-Up!": The Funhouse Friends go to Herotropolis to have a picnic with Captain Clarabelle. Unfortunately, she and the other residential superheroes are away. When the Weasel Trio do not keep their hoverboard activities to the hoverboard lanes, the Fantabulous Five + 1 must pursue them. They make a mess for local waste collectors Hilda and Horace Horsecollar to pick up as both sides soon learn the errors of their mistakes. "Dino Duck!": The Funhouse Friends go to Prehistoric World to partake in activities with T-Top. Once there, Daisy suspects that Donald is cheating in each of the activities so that they can get to the food. What she does not know is that something else of a similar appearance is responsible.
29	3	"Finding Treasure!"	Matthew O'Callaghan	Kim Duran	Tom Morgan	November 18, 2022	203	0.16
29	3	"Witchy Worries"	Aldina Dias	Sib Ventress	Becky Cassady	November 18, 2022	203	0.16
"Finding Treasure!": Captain Salty Bones needs the Funhouse Friends to help him find his treasure. The Funhouse Friends meet up with Captain Salty Bones at Pirate Beach on the Adventure Sea Islands. While Captain Salty Bones searches Nearby Island, the Funhouse Friends look for treasure on Lost and Found Island. They find a puppy who turns out to be Captain Salty Bones' puppy Treasure. "Witchy Worries": The Funhouse Friends are summoned to the Land of Myth and Legend by Pete the Mighty. There is a wood shortage due to Woodsman Willie being taken by a witch named "Scare-abelle" that lives in the Forest Primeval. They head to the Forest Primeval to find Woodsman Willie and learn that Care-abelle does not want the trees in the Forest Primeval. Note: This is the last episode where Will Ryan voices Willie the Giant.
30	4	"Clarabelle's Pie Day"	Aldina Dias	Kate Moran	Holly Forsyth	December 9, 2022	204	0.14
30	4	"Minnie's New Puppy"	Matthew O'Callaghan	Hanah Lee Cook	Hank Tucker	December 9, 2022	204	0.14
"Clarabelle's Pie Day": On Pie Day in Majestica, Lady Clarabelle is overwhelmed by the things she needs to do that involves making a lot of pies to sell including the ones that Farmer Pete asks her for a restock on. The Funhouse Friends help to make the pies and sell them. "Minnie's New Puppy": Minnie adopts a new puppy named Cream Puff and isn't prepared to train her. Planning to make use of the Adventure Doors, Minnie finds herself pulled into Undersea Ocean World when the puppy goes into it causing Minnie and Daisy to train it there with help from Bubbles.
31	5	"Curse of The Crusty Clam!"	Aldina Dias	Kim Duran	Melissa Suber	January 6, 2023	205	0.16
31	5	"Dream a Little Dream"	Matthew O'Callaghan	Sib Ventress	Rossen Varbanov	January 6, 2023	205	0.16
"Curse of The Crusty Clam!": The Funhouse Friends go to the Adventure Sea Islands, where Captain Salty Bones is having a clambake with Buccaneer Belle and First Mate Cuckoo-Loca. As they dig up clams, Donald comes across a clam that is said to be cursed if opened. When he does open it upon seeing a pearl, he is cursed to have everything he touches transform into a clam. Funny and Salty must work to find a way to break the curse on Donald even if he has to ask the rest of his friends for help. "Dream a Little Dream": When everyone wants to go home, Goofy is reluctant to due to the fact that if he falls asleep, strange things happen. Goofy learns about dreams where there some that are good and some that are not. Mickey opts to have a sleepover at Funny. Once everyone is asleep, Funny uses his tricks to send everyone to the Land of Dreams, where the locations have been randomizing and every other character from the Adventure Worlds is present.
32	6	"Seas the Day!"	Matthew O'Callaghan	Sib Ventress	Hank Tucker	January 13, 2023	207	0.12
32	6	"Play Nice!"	Aldina Dias	Kim Duran	Holly Forsyth	January 13, 2023	207	0.12
"Seas the Day!": Mortimer joins the gang on a sailing trip on the Adventure Sea Islands where they are to go on an expedition to Lost and Found Island. Mortimer claims that he has had some sailing experience leading to some stormy surprises. Play Nice!": The Funhouse Friends build a new snow pal named Rosie from the same magical snow on Winter Mountain. Rosie plays a bit too rough for Sunny. Upon learning of this, it is up to Minnie to get Rosie straight and get her to play with Sunny the right way.
33	7	"Rescuing the Rutabaga Ruby"	Aldina Dias	Kate Moran	Becky Cassady	January 22, 2023	206	0.22
33	7	"Goofy Doesn't Like It!"	Matthew O'Callaghan	Hanah Lee Cook	Tom Morgan	January 22, 2023	206	0.22
"Rescuing the Rutabaga Ruby": In the Adventure Sea Islands, the Funhouse Friends helps Captain Salty Bones get the Rutabaga Ruby back from the Belching Idol. "Goofy Doesn't Like It!": Funny assumes the form of an airplane to fly everyone to South Korea and celebrate the Lunar New Year. When Goofy does not try new food, Mickey, Minnie, and their friend Ye Eun help him understand that it could hurt others' feelings.
34	8	"Tooth or Consequences!"	Aldina Dias	Kim Duran	Becky Cassady	February 10, 2023	209	0.10
34	8	"The Heroic Games"	Matthew O'Callaghan	Kathleen Sarnelli Kapukchyan	Tom Morgan & David Zhu	February 10, 2023	209	0.10
"Tooth or Consequences!": Minnie tells Cream Puff about the Tooth Fairy when she loses her tooth. When the pets are asleep, the Funhouse Friends meet the Tooth Fairy who accidentally went under Pluto's pillow. They soon learn that the Tooth Fairy needs help collecting the large and heavy tooth of Woodsman Willie in the Land of Myth and Legend. "The Heroic Games": In the Land of Myth and Legend, Pete the Mighty competes in the Heroic Games and underestimates Saiya, a short Mayan hero. To make Pete the Mighty see that nobody can be underestimated, the witch Care-abelle shrinks him. While Mickey and Donald help Pete the Mighty look for Saiya, the others stall the Heroic Games which leads to the creation of the opening ceremony. Note: To replace Will Ryan, Brock Powell takes over the voice of Willie the Giant.
35	9	"Birds of a Feather"	Aldina Dias	Kate Moran	Holly Forsyth	February 24, 2023	210	0.09
35	9	"Salty vs. Pepper"	Matthew O'Callaghan	Hanah Lee Cook	Hank Tucker	February 24, 2023	210	0.09
"Birds of a Feather": The Funhouse Friends are called to the Adventure Sea Islands by a letter from Captain Salty Bones to help Buccaneer Belle and First Mate Cuckoo-Loca bring the parrots to their new owners. During this time, the parrots constantly keep asking First Mate Cuckoo-Loca question after question which gets on her nerves. Upon learning of this when First Mate Cuckoo-Loca withdraws from the deck, Mickey and Minnie must help her get the parrots in line when it comes to going through a location of ship-smashing rocks. "Salty vs. Pepper": The Funhouse Friends are called to the Adventure Sea Islands to join Captain Salty Bones in searching for treasure. They soon find themselves in competition with Captain Pepper Lemon and her parrot One-Eyed Jack who Salty is feuding with as it seems that Pepper did not invite him to her birthday party. As both pirate captains own one half of the key, the Funhouse Friends board each of the two ships to get Salty and Pepper back on good terms.
36	10	"Just Plane Quackers"	Aldina Dias	Sib Ventress	Melissa Suber	March 31, 2023	211	0.14
36	10	"Frannie Takes Flight!"	Matthew O'Callaghan	Kim Duran	Rossen Varbanov	March 31, 2023	211	0.14
"Just Plane Quackers": Funny grants Goofy's wish for everyone to fly airplanes by having them do an air ralley at Sky High World. They fly over the Adventure Worlds through the Cloud Doors to Majestica, the Land of Myth and Legend, and Sunny Gulch. Daisy is weary about the event after her disastrous flying experience last time. Funny also turns the Floaty Coaster into airplanes as he invites Farfus the Dragon, Innkeeper Cuckoo-Loca, Pete the Mighty, and Mayor Clarabelle to join in. Minnie must help Daisy overcome her weariness to get through the air rally. "Frannie Takes Flight!": After helping Daisy master the trampoline, the Funhouse Friends get a call from Farfus the Dragon about a playdate in Majestica with him and his sister Frannie the Griffin. Upon arrival in Majestica, they learn from Gus, Gertie, and Grace that Frannie is preparing for her first flight as Farfus wants to teach her. After showing off the first lesson in fancy flying, Farfus finds that Frannie is nervous about flying. The Funhouse Friends work to help Farfus teach Frannie how to do simple flying.
37	11	"No Thrills, Please!"	Aldina Dias	Hanah Lee Cook	Becky Cassady	April 21, 2023	212	0.11
37	11	"Space Doggies"	Matthew O'Callaghan	Kate Moran	Tom Morgan	April 21, 2023	212	0.11
"No Thrills, Please!": On Floaty Coaster Day, Mickey, his friends, and Windy fly the Floaty Coaster to Sunny Gulch to give rides to Mayor Clarabelle, Wanda Warbler, and the other Sunny Gulch citizens. Pete and Horace have different feelings about roller coasters causing the Funhouse Friends to work on getting used to it through ground-based activities associated with the Floaty Coaster. While Pete works to master each one, Horace has some difficulty with them. "Space Doggies": The Funhouse Friends head on Spaceship Funny to Mars for a playdate with Martian Mickey and Martian Minnie. While the Funhouse Friends play galactic limbo with Martian Mickey and Martian Minnie, Zoop Bloop watches over Pluto and Teddy as part of a pet playdate, where they partake in Zoop Bloop's activities. Though things start to go awry when one of the Martian bones dug up by Pluto and Teddy are snatched by some Martian Gophers causing Zoop Bloop to follow Pluto, Teddy, and the Martian Gophers.
38	12	"Ready to Play, Ruthie!"	Aldina Dias	Sib Ventress	Holly Forsyth	May 5, 2023	213	0.16
38	12	"Goofy Dogs!"	Matthew O'Callaghan	Kim Duran	Phil Mosness	May 5, 2023	213	0.16
"Ready to Play, Ruthie!": Funny calls the Funhouse Friends to inform them about a call from Powerhouse Pete who needs his help playing in a baseball game in Sportstopia. The reason for this is to take the place of his teammates who quit because of a new teammate named Ruthie Gibson. Her excitement causes her to fail to share with the rest of Powerhouse Pete's teammates. Mickey must work to get Ruthie to share. Meanwhile, Pluto has a hard time learning to share when playing with Champion Chip and Dynamo Dale. "Goofy Dogs!: Mickey gets an invitation from Rocket Mouse in Funny's mailbox inviting them to a fireworks spectacular in Outer Space. Due to Goofy forgetting to have a snack before departure, Funny takes a detour to the Lunar Lunch Box run by Lunar Clarabelle. Upon arrival, the Funhouse Friends find that Lunar Clarabelle cannot cook the hot dogs right. Goofy offers to help Lunar Clarabelle make hot dogs the right way. Once that was done, Goofy helps Lunar Clarabelle make hot dogs attract customers as he finds himself in a dilemma regarding the fireworks show as Mickey, his friends, and Rocket Mouse come to his aid. Meanwhile Martian Mickey & Martian Minnie Gets Goofy Dogs for the fireworks show.
39	13	"3:10 to Rocky Road"	Aldina Dias	Kate Moran	Melissa Suber	May 19, 2023	214	0.08
39	13	"Please and Thank You"	Matthew O'Callaghan	Hanah Lee Cook	Rossen Varbanov	May 19, 2023	214	0.08
"3:10 to Rocky Road": On a hot day, the Funhouse Friends work to keep cool. They get an invite from Mayor Clarabelle to come to Sunny Gulch for a "sweet surprise". Upon arrival, they learn that there is a town social involving Rocky Road Mountain, where rocky road ice cream is produced. A delivery is going to arrive at 3:10 for the town social. Conductor Pete arrives stating that the Weasel Gang has stolen the train that the rocky road ice cream. While Mickey and Goofy accompany Conductor Pete to reclaim the stolen ice cream, things go awry when Sneezel accidentally starts the train and cannot get it stop. "Please and Thank You": Funny informs the Funhouse Friends that King Ludwig has invited them and the pets to a furry fancy ball in Majestica. They proceed to work on getting Pluto, Teddy, and Cream Puff ready. Mortimer arrives at the Funhouse while walking through the woods wanting in on the trip and improvises a rock named Kevin as a pet. It is apparent that Mortimer does not have good manners as he has done the opposite when getting ready. Afterwards, they head to Majestica, where Mortimer is still not acting politely. Mickey must now work to get Mortimer to use good manners before the fancy ball is ruined.
40	14	"HALT, Tiger!"	Aldina Dias	Kate Moran	Holly Forsyth	June 9, 2023	216	0.11
40	14	"You Gotta Be Kitten Me!"	Matthew O'Callaghan	Hanah Lee Cook	Hank Tucker	June 9, 2023	216	0.11
"HALT, Tiger!": As Daisy pretends to be a tiger, Funny states that there are shapeshifters reside in the Land of Myth of Legend. He directs them to the location Shadow Mountain, where the shapeshifter Cho Shook (who can shapeshift into a nine-tailed fox) resides and magic is in Shadow Mountain. As they engage in games, they end up playing with the Dokkaebi. After getting caught up on the Dokkaebi games and feeling left out by the others, Daisy finds herself shapeshifting into a white tiger with purple stripes. You Gotta Be Kitten Me!: The Funhouse Friends head to the Land of Myth of Legend to see Thalia's comedy show at its Egyptian area. Upon arrival, they meet Bast as they find a lot of cats there. When they find where Thalia is performing, they find that Thalia has a fear of cats. Minnie, Daisy, and Bast follow Thalia into one of the pyramids and is trapped behind one of the hidden doors. Once they get her out, Minnie, Daisy, and Bast must work to get Thalia to see that cats are not scary.
41	15	"King Ludwig's Day Off"	Aldina Dias	Sib Ventress	Holly Forsyth	July 28, 2023	219	N/A
41	15	"No Horsing Around"	Matthew O'Callaghan	Hanah Lee Cook	Hank Tucker	July 28, 2023	219	N/A
King Ludwig's Day Off: King Ludwig is coming to the Funhouse for his day off while the Funhouse Friends spend time at King Ludwig's castle in Majestica. King Ludwig needed a break from his royal footmen and isn't up to having Funny helping out as he wants to try things on his own. Back in Majestica, the Funhouse Friends find how helpful the royal footmen are where they also find that the footmen, the Weasel Trio and the royal chef never taught King Ludwig how to do anything on his own. No Horsing Around: Today is the Sportstopia Horse Show, where the Funhouse Friends are assigned horses by Horace Horsecollar. Minnie and Daisy are taught how to ride their assigned Taffy and Peaches how to take care of their horses by cleaning their stables, feed them, cleaning the horses and preparing their equipment for the show. Though Daisy isn't up for doing the cleaning part much to Taffy's annoyance. Now Daisy must earn Taffy's trust and learn proper horse care by the time of the Sportstopia Horse Show.
42	16	"Dino Safari"	Aldina Dias & Matthew O'Callaghan	Kate Moran	Becky Cassady & Tom Morgan	August 11, 2023	218	N/A
The Funhouse Friends go to Prehistoric World. This time, they are turned into paleontologists and are enlisted by the local dinosaurs to watch over the dinosaur eggs. Due to Daisy getting briefly distracted with Pluto playing with T-Top, the eggs slowly hatch and roll away. Daisy enlists her friends to help find the eggs and get them back to the nest before the dinosaur parents return and the eggs are done hatching. Meanwhile, the Weasel Trio from Sunny Gulch arrive at the Funhouse to return the harmonica that the Funhouse Friends allowed them to borrow. While wanting to thank the Funhouse Friends, the Weasel Trio stumble into the Adventure Door to Prehistoric World, where they meet T-Top.
43	17	"The Kooky Paleontologist!"	Matthew O'Callaghan	Kate Moran	David Zhu	August 18, 2023	217	N/A
43	17	"That's My Jam!"	Aldina Dias	Sib Ventress	Melissa Suber	August 18, 2023	217	N/A
The Kooky Paleontologist!: While the Funhouse Friends are playing the Zany Malaney Dance Game, Donald accidentally breaks the game controller as Minnie wonders if there is a way to fix it. Funny suggests they turn to Kooky Scientist Von Drake can fix it as he summons him from Halloweenville. He examines the broken controller and states that they need molten hot lava. To precure the hot lava, they head to Prehistoric World and head to Lava Hot Lava Volcano as Kooky Scientist Von Drake meets T-Top and Tilly and reworks Mickey's walkie talkie to be a dinosaur translator. That's My Jam!: The Funhouse Friends are doing a jam session when it isn't going well. As they need different instruments to pull it off, Funny takes them to Musicville to find their instruments. Upon arrival, the Funhouse Friends work to find the instruments that they need. After Mickey finds his baton, Minnie and Donald obtain a rock guitar and drum set from a local rock band called The Weaz-Tones while Goofy and Daisy obtain a drum machine and DJ turntables to perform hip-hop music which leads to a combined performances of "Ode to Joy".
44	18	"Dino See, Dino Do"	Aldina Dias	Hanah Lee Cook	Becky Cassady	August 25, 2023	221	N/A
44	18	"Pete the Mighty Baby!"	Matthew O'Callaghan	Kim Duran	Tom Morgan	August 25, 2023	221	N/A
Dino See, Dino Do: The Funhouse Friends go to Prehistoric World for a dinosaur slumber party with Daffodil the Ankylosaurus and Stella the Apatosaurus, where they must contend with keeping the baby dinosaurs out of danger from things like a sticky mud pool, a small rock formation at a water slide, and low-hanging vines. Though Daffodil and Stella keep following Daisy and Goofy when they try to do things that there. Pete the Mighty Baby!: Pete the Mighty summons the Funhouse Friends to the Land of Myth and Legend for a pizza lunch with Pete the Mighty's mother Mama Mighty. Donald tries out the Fountain of Youth that Cheesy Chip and Pepperoni Dale put in as Pete the Mighty also turns into a baby. Both baby Donald and baby Pete the Mighty take off in the Pegasus chariot. While Minnie and Daisy go after baby Donald and baby Pete the Mighty to get them back into the Fountain of Youth to restore them to normal before the arrow points straight up, Mickey and Goofy stall Mama Mighty.
45	19	"For Pete's Sake!"	Aldina Dias	Sib Ventress	Holly Forsyth	September 8, 2023	222	N/A
45	19	"Minnie Golf"	Matthew O'Callaghan	Chris Bramante	Hank Tucker	September 8, 2023	222	N/A
For Pete's Sake!: Cheesy Chip and Pepperoni Dale call the Funhouse Friends to the Land of Myth and Legend. They are putting together a monument to their pizza achievements. Wanting a monument of himself, Pete the Mighty wants to put up a statue of himself by carving his image into the Magnificent Marble Mountain near the Forest Primeval. Care-abelle overhears it and makes Magnificent Marble Mountain and plans to user her magic to prevent this from happening for her own reasons. Minnie Golf: It is game night at Funny, where Minnie always wins some of the games. They are summoned to Outer Space by Martian Mickey and Martian Minnie to Asteroid Pete's Amazing Cave of Amazement, where there are different games for everyone there. While everyone does the activities there, Minnie and Martian Minnie engage in a game of mini-golf, where the Scorebot 9000 keeps score. Though Minnie worries about losing for the first time as Martian Minnie is an expert at this type of mini-golf.
46	20	"No Bear Hugs"	Aldina Dias	Hanah Lee Cook	Becky Cassady	September 22, 2023	224	N/A
46	20	"Where's Funny?"	Matthew O'Callaghan	Story by : Sib Ventress; Written by : Kate Moran	Tom Morgan	September 22, 2023	224	N/A
No Bear Hugs: The Funhouse Friends head to Winter Mountain to go toboggan riding with Yeti with Goofy bringing his plush penguin Trevor. Upon arrival, they meet Yeti's polar bear friend Kyle who has a plush penguin named Sonia. Though Kyle does not want to have a bear hug. Goofy suspects that Kyle does not like him and works to do nice things for Trevor while wondering why Kyle does not like hugs. Where's Funny?: The Funhouse Friends head to Funny to obtain some picnic items from Funny. Unfortunately, Funny's presence, Teddy and Windy are not present. With the funhouse locked, they use the spare key under the different welcome mats up until a crow takes it. Daisy tries to go in through the window and keeps getting ejected out of different parts. Once they are inside, they have to work on enjoying the day without Funny.
47	21	"Cora The Pirate Crab!"	Matthew O'Callaghan	Hanah Lee Cook	Rossen Varbanov	September 26, 2023	208	N/A
47	21	"The Curious Case of the Kooky Scientist"	Aldina Dias	Kate Moran	Melissa Suber	September 26, 2023	208	N/A
Cora the Pirate Crab!: The Funhouse Friends get a message from Captain Salty Bones asking them for help looking for a locked-up treasure chest. Upon arrival, they find that he has two maps: one of them is for the key on Clamshell Island and the other is for the treasure chest on Lost and Found Island. On Goofy's suggestion, Captain Salty Bones and Daisy recruit Cora to move some boulders on Rocky Island. When Captain Salty Bones makes Cora his first mate, Goofy feels depressed about not becoming first mate as he tries to get her to do a better job. The Curious Case of the Kooky Scientist: Funny shows off his Floatycoaster Clock. The Funhouse Friends gets a call from Squeakers the Bat telling them that Kooky Scientist Von Drake wants to show them his new invention. Upon arrival in Halloweenville, Kooky Scientist Von Drake's lab assistants Fritz Chip and Igor Dale accidentally break the Whatsamatter Fix-It Ray trying to use it on more broken stuff and work to fix it with tape and glue as they accidentally make Kooky Scientist Von Drake invisible upon it accidentally being used on him. The Funhouse Friends learn what happened to Kooky Scientist Von Drake and must help him fix the Whatsamatter Fix-It Ray.
48	22	"Stink, Stank, Stunk!"	Matthew O'Callaghan	Kim Duran	Phil Mosness	October 6, 2023	215	N/A
48	22	"Día de los Muertos"	Matthew O'Callaghan	Kathleen Sarnelli Kapukchyan	Tom Morgan	October 6, 2023	215	N/A
Stink, Stank, Stunk!: Daisy tends to her plant Violet up until it wilts. She followed the instructions up until she forgot the sunlight. The Funhouse Friends get a call from Lady Clarabelle who needs help delivering pies. While Funny checks up on Violet, the Funhouse Friends head to Majestica, where a smell bothers them. Farmer Pete tells the Funhouse Friends about a "sky seed" that fell into his hand and it grew into a giant pumpkin. Mickey figures out that it comes from a cloud containing an Adventure Door that leads to Halloweenville. Upon arrival with help from Farfus, they learn about the Grand Pumpkin's seed misplacement from Mayor Franken-Pete and Kooky Scientist Von Drake thanks to the sneezing of Shorty Ghost and that it requires Halloweenville's sun to grow. Día de los Muertos: As the Funhouse Friends enjoy hot chocolate, Donald gets a call from his friend Panchito Pistoles who invites them to celebrate Día de los Muertos in Mexico City as he describes it to everyone. This causes Daisy to remember the loss of her Grand-Duck Delores as Panchito advises her to honor it. Funny assumes his airplane form in order take them to Mexico. Upon arrival, the Funhouse Friends meet up with Panchito Pistoles and José Carioca, who were previously friends with Donald as the Three Caballeros. They learn about Day of the Dead parade puppets like the Calaca puppets, the Calavera make-up, the Día de los Muertos cuisines and the ofrenda where the dead are honored.
49	23	"Mayor Franken-Pete's Very Bad Day"	Aldina Dias	Kate Moran	Hank Tucker	October 27, 2023	226	N/A
49	23	"The Lost Party Rings!"	Matthew O'Callaghan	Kathleen Sarnelli Kapukchyan	Melissa Suber	October 27, 2023	226	N/A
Mayor Franken-Pete's Very Bad Day: Donald stacks a pile of pancakes in front of Goofy and Daisy up until Mickey and Minnie disrupt him enough for him to drink water as part of his Big Calm Plan. The Funhouse Friends get a call from Squeakers the Bat who states that Mayor Franken-Pete is having a very bad day and that they are enlisted to make him feel much better. Without The Costumes, Upon arrival in Halloweenville, they find that he is upset that he got dinky turnips instead of giant turnips for next week's Halloweenville's Spooky Fest. The Funhouse Friends put him through their Be Calm Plan as most of them tie in with the dinky turnips. The Lost Party Rings!: The Funhouse Friends prepare for Bubbles and Seabiscuit's Annual Seahorse Spectacular in Underwater Ocean World. Daisy has just made the ring keeper for Bubbles and Seabiscuit. After helping Goofy to retrace his steps on where his bow-tie is, the Funhouse Friends head to Underwater Ocean World, where they help Bubbles, Seabiscuit and Octo-Pete set up for the Annual Seahorse Spectacular. Daisy's job is expanded to helping Octo-Pete with his checklist. Afterwards, Daisy finds that she lost the rings and Goofy helps her retrace her steps on where she went with Octo-Pete.
50	24	"Mickey's Sky-High Birthday!"	Aldina Dias	Kim Duran	Becky Cassady	November 17, 2023	225	N/A
50	24	"The What About Me Birthday"	Matthew O'Callaghan	Hanah Lee Cook	Holly Forsyth	November 17, 2023	225	N/A
Mickey's Sky-High Birthday!: Everyone makes Mickey a birthday breakfast and a birthday card with a birthday wish. Mickey wishes that he wants a birthday ride in the sky. Funny recommends that they go to Razzle Dazzle Dunes to ride on the magic carpets. Upon arrival, Daisy pitches to Minnie, Donald and Goofy that they should spice it up with a bigger birthday party with items from Trader Clarabelle's different stands. Daisy gets three cakes and a balloon, Donald gets a noisemaker, Goofy gets harmonica-playing camels and Minnie gets decorations. The What About Me Birthday: The Funhouse Friends have been invited to the first birthday of the tiger Ae-Cha in the Land of Myth and Legend as Funny tells them about Doljabi. Upon arrival, they meet Ae-Cha and her family where Ae-Cha's mother find different items for the Doljabi with help from Kyung Wong. They run into Chong Sook who gives them a paintbrush. Then they get coins from the Dokkaebi after helping them do mu harvesting. Though Kyung Wong has trouble when everyone pays more attention to Ae-Cha causing the Funhouse Friends to set him straight.
51	25	"Minnie's Snow Ball!"	Aldina Dias	Kim Duran	Melissa Suber	November 29, 2023	220	N/A
51	25	"The Snow Princess"	Aldina Dias	Kim Duran	Jill Colbert	November 29, 2023	220	N/A
Minnie's Snow Ball!: The Funhouse Friends are planning a picnic in Funhouse Forest. Unfortunaely, it started raining. To remedy this, Minnie plans to go to Fairy Square, Majestica to have a picnic there. Upon arrival, there are no flowers as Hibiscus Hilda explains that it is the first day of winter. They help Hibiscus Hilda prepare Fairy Square for the Winter Ball before King Ludwig arrives with Lady Clarabelle and Farmer Pete. Though things get complicated when a winter storm arrives. The Snow Princess: Funny tells the Funhouse Friends a story about the Snow Princess who lives on Winter Mountain and how she visited a snow castle that some kids visited. Wanting to meet the Snow Princess, Minnie leads her friends to Winter Mountain to make a snow castle. Upon arrival, they look for a place to build it as they use magical snowballs to build a snow castle. After it is built, they await her arrival. When she does not show up, the Funhouse Friends work to make the snow castle much bigger so that they can impress the Snow Princess.
52	26	"Santa's Crash Landing"	Aldina Dias & Matthew O'Callaghan	Kathleen Sarnelli Kapukchyan	Melissa Suber & Phil Mosness	December 1, 2023	223	N/A
It is Christmas as the Funhouse Friends decorate Funny. Each one talks about what Christmas is important to them. Just then, Santa Claus and his sleigh crash land nearby. Although the reindeer are alright, the gnomes Pumpkin and Olive find that his sleigh is broken and will take a few days for them to fix. After Santa gets warmed, he states that he has three more stops in Majestica, Halloweenville, and Winter Mountain. While Pumpkin, Olive and Fig tend to the reindeer, Funny plans to assume his sleigh form and have everyone make use of the Floaty Coasters to help deliver the remaining presents to Lady Clarabelle, Kooky Scientist Von Drake, Fritz Chip, Igor Dale, Sunny, Rosie and even Yeti.
53	27	"There's Something About Teddy!"	Aldina Dias	Kim Duran	Becky Cassady	January 5, 2024	227	N/A
53	27	"Finders Keepers?"	Matthew O'Callaghan	Story by : Sib Ventress; Written by : Hanah Lee Cook	Tom Morgan	January 5, 2024	227	N/A
There's Something About Teddy!: While the Funhouse Friends are playing fetch with Pluto and Teddy, an incident occurs when Teddy briefly disassembles and reassembles with the chew toy inside him unbeknownst to the others. This affects the Funhouse Friends' trip to the Land of Myth and Legend, where they watch over Pete the Mighty's pet Cerberus trio while he is away visiting Mama the Mighty. As Teddy keeps hopping with exhaustion and scratching, Mickey and Goofy take him to Winter Mountain to deal with his exhaustion. When the problem persists, Mickey and Goofy take Teddy to Halloweenville to see if Kooky Scientist Von Drake can help. Finders Keepers?: While working in Funny's garden, Minnie finds a trowel and asks around if any of her friends have lost it. It turns out to be Daisy's trowel as Minnie returns it to her. The Funhouse Friends are called to the Land of Myth and Legend to help Care-a-Belle and Woodsman Willie plant new plants in the forest. Care-a-Belle has a Grow Tool that enables her to grow plants and shrink them to their appropriate sizes. When showing to the Funhouse Friends, Care-a-Belle finds that the Grow Tool Stone has fallen off as the Funhouse Friends grow plants naturally. Goofy finds the Grow Tool Stone not knowing what it is up until it ends up growing the plants to unnatural lengths around Funny. Now Goofy must return the Grow Tool Stone to Care-a-Belle at the time when the meadow starts to grow out of control.
54	28	"Majestica's New Troubadour!"	Aldina Dias	Kate Moran	Holly Forsyth	January 12, 2024	228	N/A
54	28	"Minnie's Pod Mod"	Matthew O'Callaghan	Hanah Lee Cook	Hank Tucker	January 12, 2024	228	N/A
Majestica's New Troubadour!: The Funhouse gets a call from King Ludwig's herald, stating that they have been invited to attend the initiation of the latest member of King Ludwig's royal court. The Funhouse Friends arrive where King Ludwig is told by the Royal Troubadour states that he cannot compose a welcome song if he does not know who the new addition is. When it comes to the initiation, everyone meets Belle Canto who is the new troubadour for Majestica. The Royal Troubadour thinks that King Ludwig is spending more time, but Mickey does not think so. Minnie finds out that Belle will sing before the royal court as she never performed a big crowd before as the Funhouse Friends and the Royal Troubadour get her ready for the performance from Majestica to Troubadour. Minnie's Pod Mod: Funny takes the Funhouse Friends to Sportstopia, where they will be trying out some mods for its obstacle course. Upon arrival, they try out their pod mods and head to the Sportstopia Raceway. Mickey's pod mod has bouncy wheels, Donald's pod mod has rocket engines, Daisy's pod mod can fly, Goofy's pod mod can assume a unipod mode and Funny's pod mod gets surrounded by a large wheel. When it comes to Minnie's pod mod, she finds it emitting a flagpole as she wonders how it can come in handy. They all try out their pod mods on the obstacle course that involves bumpy terrain, spikes, banana peels and even a twisty road at the racing bowtique, then they had a winner for all of the 6 pod mods!
55	29	"Low-Key Coqui"	Aldina Dias	Lindsay Lleras	Melissa Suber	January 19, 2024	229	N/A
55	29	"Pinky and the Bees"	Matthew O'Callaghan	Kim Duran	David Zhu	January 19, 2024	229	N/A
Low-Key Coqui: As the Funhouse Friends are playing a video game called "Froggy Frenzy", Funny reminds everyone to thank Minnie for the cookies. They are then enlisted by Captain Salty Bones to look for the coqui Lukey who sings everyone to sleep so that everyone in the Adventure Sea Islands can finally sleep. Upon getting a description from Captain Salty Bones and Buccaneer Belle, the Funhouse Friends search the jungles until they find Lukey in a cave. They learn from Lukey that he is new to the singing everyone to sleep gig and that he hasn't been thanked as the Funhouse Friends plan to rectify this. Pinky and the Bees: Donald shows off his creation of a lawn chair and some balloons powered by Windy which he plans to bring with him to the Enchanted Rainforest because he keeps getting ants in his shirt. Upon arrival, the Funhouse Friends make their way to the Enchanted Tree as the Enchanted Rainforest helps them to there. While Mickey and Daisy follow the honey bees, Minnie, Donald, Goofy, and Windy continue to the Enchanted Tree, where they meet up with Pinky as the balloons get popped enough for Donald to get attacked by the ants. When both groups arrive at the Enchantred Tree, the Queen Bee is annoyed with Pinky playing in the tree which is disrupting their honey making causing the Funhouse Friends to find a compromise between Pinky and the Queen Bee.
56	30	"Crystal Clearwater Vs. The Annoying Algae"	Aldina Dias	Hanah Lee Cook	Becky Cassady	January 26, 2024	230	N/A
56	30	"Trolland's Big Adventure!"	Matthew O'Callaghan	Kate Moran	Tom Morgan	January 26, 2024	230	N/A
Crystal Clearwater Vs. The Annoying Algae: In the Adventure Sea Islands, Captain Wheezelene, Cheezel, and Sneezel have returned from their trip to the Enchanted Rainforest, where Sneezel had found an algae from their trip and releases it into Big Fish Swamp. Then they call the Funhouse Friends to see it. When they arrive, they find that Big Fish Swamp is now pink and is making the fish sick. Funny summons Crystal Clearwater who identifies the pink stuff as pink algae as everyone works to suck up the pink algae from Big Fish Swamp as it is considered an invasive species here and clean up the local animals. Trolland's Big Adventure!: Funny reads a story to the Funhouse Friends and a visiting Trolland. As there are no stories on heroic troll knights in Funny's inventory, the Funhouse Friends plan to find him a heroic adventure in Majestica. They first visit the market to put together a knight armor for Trolland with help from Lady Clarabelle, Innkeeper Cuckoo-Loca, and Farmer Pete. Trolland gets a heroic mission when Ironsmith Horace asks him to bring a wooden chest to King Ludwig. They soon have a setback when the wooden chest ends up sliding into the Dark Forest and slides over the Somestink Swamp. Now they must rescue the wooden chest without getting the swamp water on them or else they'll still smell bad.

=== Season 3 (2024–25) ===
No. overall	No. in season	Title	Directed by	Written by	Storyboard by	Original release date	Prod. code	U.S. viewers (millions)
57	1	"Chickie Boo-Boo, Where Are You?"	Aldina Dias	Kim Duran	Holly Forsyth	February 23, 2024	301	N/A
57	1	"Playground Heroes!"	Melissa Suber	Kate Moran	Becky Cassady	February 23, 2024	301	N/A
Chickie Boo-Boo, Where Are You?: While getting his hat out of the tree after it was blown into it by Funny, Goofy accidentally steps on Minnie's picnic basket while trying to retrieve his hat. Luckily, the picnic basket can snap back together as Minnie reveals while Windy gets Goofy's hat. Then everyone heads to Majestica's Cloud Kingdom to have a picnic with Willie the Giant. Upon arrival, the Funhouse Friends meet up with Willie and help set the table for the picnic. Unfortunately, Chickie Boo-Boo had accidentally ate the apple pie and hides from everyone as they look for her. Playground Heroes!: As the Funhouse Friends remove the dried-up plants from the garden to make room for the new plants and set up a swing, they get a call from Captain Clarabelle who needs help building Herotropolis' first playground. Upon arrive, the Funhouse Friends become the Fantabulous Five meet up with Captain Clarabelle as they head to the location of Herotropolis' playground that involves clearing away the rocks and dirt piles, laying down concrete, and setting up the playground equipment despite Minnie's claims that there are no trees present. Once that was done, Captain Clarabelle and the Fantabulous Five find the equipment too hot because of the sunlight and the lack of shade.
58	2	"The Trail Less Traveled"	Aldina Dias	Hanah Lee Cook	David Zhu	March 1, 2024	302	N/A
58	2	"Vardavar!"	Melissa Suber	Kathleen Sarnelli Kapukchyan	Tom Morgan	March 1, 2024	302	N/A
The Trail Less Traveled: The Funhouse Friends head to Sunny Gulch, where they meet up with Mayor Clarabelle who plans to take them on a trail ride. Unfortunately, Mickey and Donald end up helping Cowboy Pete wrangle his runaway barrels needed for the root beer and will catch up later. Mayor Clarabelle takes Minnie, Goofy, and Daisy on a trail ride to Hidden Valley, where they will see the Highfallutin' Falls. As Mayor Clarabelle and Goofy feed the horse, Minnie and Daisy are advised not to go off the trail and to remember some things to help them find their way back. When they do go off trail, they must remember Mayor Clarabelle's advice to find their way back to Mayor Clarabelle and Goofy. Vardavar: After Funny attempts to use Fan-y to cool down the Funhouse Friends during a hot day, Minnie receives a package containing her new buttons and bows dress. They soon receive a video call from Care-a-Belle who invites them to the Land of Myth and Legend to partake in Vardavar and meet with the Armenian water goddess Astghik. As the event is also attended by Pete the Mighty and Saiya, Minnie couldn't resist wearing the buttons and bows dress on a hot day and worries about getting it wet. Astghik understands that Minnie does not want the water to ruin her new dress. While noting that this was not the day to wear her new dress, Minnie tries to keep cool until she is accidentally splashed causing Astghik to come to Minnie's aid and rectify her plight.
59	3	"Daisy and the Missing Dream"	Aldina Dias	Chris Bramante	Phil Mosness	March 8, 2024	304	N/A
59	3	"Daisy's Big Picture"	Melissa Suber	Mike Kubat	Chris Otsuki	March 8, 2024	304	N/A
Daisy and the Missing Dream: During a slumber party at Funny, the Funhouse Friends watch some clips of the different pies they had. When Daisy asks if Funny has a memory of the apple pie picking from an apple pie tree and that she only dreamed about it, Funny suggests that they go to sleep to enter the Land of Dreams and find the apple pie tree. Upon arrival in Daisy's dream, Daisy works to remember where she saw the apple pie tree as the Funhouse Friends come across a fishing hole with different ice creams, run into Kooky Scientist Von Drake and Tiny Farfus, flying on Pteranodons, and encountering a talking Pluto who tries to help Daisy plant an apple pie tree. Daisy's Big Picture: Daisy is trying the Focus Focus Film Flinger camera that Ludwig Von Drake had invented. To avoid anyone breaking it while taking the perfect group selfie, Daisy takes the Funhouse Friends to the right location in the Land of Myth and Legend. Upon arrival, they try to take the picture in front of Pete the Mighty's fountain only for Pete the Mighty to state that the fountain is being cleaned causing the Funhouse Friends to clean the fountain themselves. Once that was done, Donald slips on a soap setting off a chain reaction that ruins the picture. Then she tries to have the right picture taken at Winter Mountain, where Sunny and Rosie have fun with them until they accidentally cause an avalanche near Yeti's house. The final chance for Daisy involves the sunset picture in Prehistoric World when T-Top and his fellow baby dinosaurs get involved.
60	4	"Goofy Foot Grommet"	Aldina Dias	Kate Moran	Tom Morgan	March 29, 2024	306	N/A
60	4	"The Enchanted Rescue"	Melissa Suber	Kim Duran	Rossen Varbanov	March 29, 2024	306	N/A
Goofy Foot Grommet: Goofy shows his friends his new surfboard. Funny suggests that they go to Giant Crab Island in the Adventure Sea Islands to have a surf day where Cora is an expert surfer. Upon arrival, Cora takes them to Surf Shore Beach to go surfing and has extra surfboard for everyone else. She also advises everyone to avoid the waves at Cranky Cove. As Donald works to build a sandcastle, everyone goes surfing. When a long wave occurs, everyone surfs it as a party wave until Goofy is washed into Cranky Cove which breaks Goofy's new board and is unable to get back in the water. The Enchanted Rescue: During a stormy day in Funhouse Forest which aborts the outdoor scavenger hunt, the Funhouse Friends want to have the scavenger hunt elsewhere. They head to the Enchanted Rainforest to do a scavenger hunt since everywhere else has bad weather. Upon arrival, the Funhouse Forest is told that they would like to have a scavenger hunt as they are told to find an orange leaf, a smooth rock, a butterfly cocoon, drops of water from a waterhole, a pink flower petal, and a shiny crystal. Pinky joins up with Minnie and Donald while Pinky's elephant friend Ellie joins up with Mickey, Daisy, and Goofy.
61	5	"Saving Major Green!"	Aldina Dias	Kate Moran	David Zhu	April 12, 2024	309	N/A
61	5	"Minnie Safari"	Aldina Dias	Ashley Mendoza	Hank Tucker	April 12, 2024	309	N/A
Saving Major Green!: Crystal Clearwater visits Funny while on her way to celebrate Arbor Day with the Funhouse Forest Gnomes. She tells the Funhouse Friends about Arbor Day. As they head to the forest clearing, they meet up with the gnome Squash to plant their saplings into the ground. Mickey and Funny accompany Crystal Clearwater to see Major Green, the oldest and biggest sequoia in Funhouse Forest. Mickey, Funny, and Crystal find that the ground around Major Green is dry as they work to save it even when the Rowdy River is found blocked. Minnie Safari: On "Read a Book Day", the Funhouse Friends read different spots. Minnie states that a cat known as the cat-o-spots is covered in spots and is hard to find. Funny informs her that there is a cat-o-spots roaming the Enchanted Rainforest causing everyone to go on a safari. Upon arrival in the Enchanted Forest, they begin their search for it as the Enchanted Rainforest points them in the right direction. Minnie follows the facts in her book to locate it as it starts to become evasive. Though Minnie and the rest of the Funhouse Friends get some unlikely help in locating it from Pinky.
62	6	"Fun-A-Palooza!"	Aldina Dias	Chris Bramante	Hank Tucker	April 26, 2024	307	N/A
62	6	"Missing Buttons and Bows!"	Melissa Suber	Mike Kubat	Phil Mosness	April 26, 2024	307	N/A
Fun-A-Palooza!: The Funhouse Friends are invited to attend a music festival called Fun-A-Palooza in Musicville by Polyphonic Pete. Upon arrival, the Funhouse Friends meet up with Polyphonic Pete and The Weaz-Tones as they work to come up with a band name. In addition, they meet the pianist Ludwig Von Drakenhoven who will also be performing. The Funhouse Friends work to practice their instrument, but Minnie is worried her xylophone skills are not good enough to play at Fun-A-Palooza due to the mistakes she makes until she gets some advice from Ludwig Von Drakenhoven. Missing Buttons and Bows!: Daisy shows off her upcoming show "How the West Was Quackers" in Sunny Gulch with Minnie helping with the buttons and bows. Upon arrival, everyone prepares for the show by setting up as Cowboy Pete keeps an eye out for anyone who might sneak in before the show starts. When Minnie's box of ribbons, buttons, and bows go missing, she thinks her friends are taking them. She does not know it yet, but the box of ribbons were snatched by Chip and Dale as the different items keep popping up near them.
63	7	"Goofy's Birthday... in Space!"	Aldina Dias & Matthew O'Callaghan	Kim Duran	Rossen Varbanov & Hank Tucker	May 3, 2024	303	N/A
Today is Goofy's birthday as he and Windy practice driving past the fake asteroids. The rest of his friends give Goofy an invitation from Rocket Mouse stating that they will be going to have Goofy's birthday party at Asteroid Pete's Fun Center. Upon arrival, the Funhouse Friends meet up with Rocket Mouse as he shows off his starship called the Starship Rocketmaster as Asteroid Pete reveals the new additions to Asteroid Pete's Fun Center. Just then, Rocket Mouse gets a distress signal from the Delta Quadrant and borrows Funny's rocket form to deal with the emergency as Goofy isn't bothered by it as he knows that Rocket Mouse must deal with different emergency. Upon finding Cosmo Cockroach with a damaged starship, Rocket Mouse and Funny soon join Cosmo in getting caught in a Cosmic Corkscrew causing the Funhouse Friends to take the Starship Rocketmaster to rescue them.
64	8	"Windy's Good Deed Days"	Aldina Dias	Hanah Lee Cook	Chris Otsuki	June 7, 2024	308	N/A
64	8	"Can I Borrow Ducky-Doo?"	Melissa Suber	Kathleen Sarnelli Kapukchyan	Becky Cassady	June 7, 2024	308	N/A
Windy's Good Deeds Day: The Funhouse Friends are going to Majestica to help King Ludwig do his castle chores. When Goofy gets his hat, he sees Windy fly off. While Goofy and Daisy go to follow Windy, the others go to help King Ludwig. Goofy and Daisy find Windy helping Olive and Pumpkin put their squash away. Then they find Windy cleaning up the picnic area as Goofy and Daisy help him out. Afterwards, Goofy and Daisy follow Windy to a bluebird nest as it trains its chicks to practice their flying lessons, helping the raccoons clean, and rescuing the Pumpkin, Fig, and Olive's squash harvest from the river. Can I Borrow Ducky-Doo?: Daisy brings her rubber ducky named Ducky-Doo to the Funhouse and briefly borrows Minnie's toy car. The Funhouse Friends get a call from Captain Wheezeline who invites them to Treasure Chest Island in the Adventure Sea Islands for a beach day. Upon arrival, Donald and Goofy play volleyball with Cheezel, Mickey and Minnie go surfing with Sneezel, and Daisy and Captain Wheezeline build a sand castle for Ducky-Doo. Captain Wheezeline wants to play with Ducky-Doo while Daisy goes swimming and is told to return Ducky-Doo when she is done. When Captain Wheezeline gets too attached to Ducky-Doo, she is unable to say goodbye yet.
65	9	"The Dino-Opolis 500"	Aldina Dias	Chris Bramante	Phil Mosness	June 21, 2024	311	N/A
65	9	"Dino Disco!"	Melissa Suber	Chris Bramante	Chris Otsuki	June 21, 2024	311	N/A
The Dino-Opolis 500: While playing frisbee, Goofy gets tired out and refuels by eating his afternoon sandwich. The Funhouse Friends get a call from Kooky Paleontologist Von Drake who invites them to attend the Dino-Opolis 500 involving the dinosaurs they befriended. Upon arrival, the Funhouse Friends pair up with the dinosaurs with Kooky Paleontologist Von Drake follows in Funny's Over Rover form. Daisy pairs up with Pearl the Segnosaurus, Donald pairs up with Arnie the Ankylosaurus, Goofy pairs up with Charlie the Apatosaurus, Minnie pairs up with Tenille the Triceratops, and Mickey pairs up with Sue the Tyrannosaurus. Whoever wins the Dino-Opolis will win a grand surprise prize. Dino Disco!: Goofy allows his friends to hear a groovy disco tune that he found as Funny explains what disco is. Minnie then teaches everyone how to do the Jumping Jellyfish which Donald struggles to dance. Taking a break from the music, the Funhouse Friends travel to Prehistoric World, where there is no music. Upon arrival, they meet up with Tenille, Tilly, and T-Top and play with them until Goofy realized that he brought his fun pod with him. Tilly and T-Top like the tunes and start dancing. As Donald struggles to get the dance moves mastered, the other dinosaurs soon start joining with Hal even joining in.
66	10	"Happy Campers"	Aldina Dias & Melissa Suber	Story by : Hanah Lee Cook & Mike Kubat; Written by : Hanah Lee Cook	Rossen Varbanov & Hank Tucker	July 29, 2024	310	N/A
Funny takes the Funhouse Friends into the great outdoors by assuming his new camper form. Upon Mickey driving Funny's camper form to the campsite, they engage in different camping activities like outdoor grilling, seeing constellations, telling ghost stories and singing campfire songs. Due to Donald playing loud music, he accidentally causes the constellation Orion and his belt, Lyra's harp, and Libra's scales to fall from the sky. The Funhouse Friends and Orion work to find the fallen constellations and work to find a way to get them back into the night sky.
67	11	"The Giant and the Goof"	Aldina Dias	Kim Duran	Tom Morgan	August 9, 2024	313	N/A
67	11	"Call Me Cora!"	Melissa Suber	Story by : Hanah Lee Cook & Kim Duran; Written by : Kim Duran	Rossen Varbanov	August 9, 2024	313	N/A
The Giant and the Goof: Goofy plays with Mickey and his paper balloon as he has a hard time catching it even when it gets caught in a tree and blows away. Funny tells the Funhouse Friends that they have been invited to a game in Majestica. Upon arrival, they meet up with Gus, Gertie, and Grace who have set up a corn hole game. Willie the Giant comes down from the Cloud Kingdom, where he is too big to play after throwing the bean bag too far. Displeased with their heights, Goofy and Willie have the fairies cast a spell that causes them to switch sizes. As Willie plays corn hole and Goofy covers for him at his barn at the time when Chickie Boo Boo is babysitting an egg, things become difficult for both of them when the egg rolls throughout Majestica. Call Me Cora!: The Funhouse Friends are preparing for a picnic with Cora at Giant Crab Island in the Adventure Sea Islands. They are joined by Mortimer who has been giving fun and silly nicknames to everyone as he does not hear that Donald dislikes his "Mr. Beaks" nickname. Upon arrival, Funny's pirate ship form blows his foghorn to get through the fog as the Funhouse Friends look out for Giant Crab Island as he gives Minnie and Daisy nicknames that they are uncomfortable with. After Donald finds Giant Crab Island, the Funhouse Friends meet up with Cora. She meets Mortimer who gives her the nickname "Crabby" as she claims that it is associated with grumpiness which bothers her. Minnie and Cora work to set Mortimer straight even when the picnic basket for the picnic is swept out to sea.
68	12	"Donald vs. the Starcade"	Aldina Dias	Chris Bramante	Phil Mosness	August 16, 2024	314	N/A
68	12	"Whose Treasure Is It?"	Melissa Suber	Mike Kubat	Chris Otsuki	August 16, 2024	314	N/A
Donald vs. the Starcade: During a relaxing evening at Funny, Donald was supposed to play checkers with Daisy only to get distracted putting together a sandwich. The Funhouse Friends get a call from Rocket Mouse who states that Asteroid Pete has installed some new games at the Starcade at Asteroid Pete's Amazing Cave of Amazement. Upon arrival in Outer Space, Daisy wants Donald to play the Deep Space Dance-Off game with her. As Daisy gets some Moon Muffin Smoothies from Lunar Clarabelle, Donald keeps getting distracted with different games played by Star Surfer Chip and Wave Rider Dale much to the dismay of Funny. Whose Treasure Is It?: The Funhouse Friends decide on where they want to go to as Goofy finds a message in a bottle from Cora who needs their help. Upon arrival at Giant Crab Island in the Adventure Sea Islands, they meet up with Cora who shows that she stumbled over a treasure chest. As Cora is no pirate, she does not know what to do with it as she is not a pirate. Mickey suggests they open the chest to see who owns it. They visit Captain Salty Bones, Captain Pepper Lemon, and Buccaneer Belle, who have no knowledge about it as Goofy keeps suggesting that they take the treasure chest to Lost and Found Island.
69	13	"Daisy Overdoes It"	Aldina Dias	Story by : Kim Duran; Written by : Paige Desjardins	Rossen Varbanov	September 6, 2024	317	N/A
69	13	"The Good, the Glad and the Goofy"	Melissa Suber	Chris Bramante	Hank Tucker	September 6, 2024	317	N/A
Daisy Overdoes It: Funny teaches yoga to Minnie and Daisy. Daisy continues doing yoga as she is having too much fun. The Funhouse Friends get a call from Pete the Mighty who is hosting Volunteer Day. Upon arriving in the Land of Myths and Legends, the Funhouse Friends start by helping out with things like unicorn adoptions, giving people Pegasus chariot rides, selling togas to children, and helping out Cheesy Chip and Pepperoni Dale. Daisy ends up signing up for every event as Minnie gets worried that Daisy will get tired out. Daisy helps out a lot of volunteer events and ends up getting herself tired out in between each volunteer opportunity. The Good, the Glad, and the Goofy: Funny gives Goofy advice on how to open a stuck jelly lid to make a jelly sandwich with water. The Funhouse Friends get a call from Mayor Clarabelle who invites everyone to attend the Sarsaparilla Festival. Upon arrival in Sunny Gulch, they meet up with Mayor Clarabelle, Wanda Warbler, and Cowboy Pete who walk them through the Sarsaparilla Festival and that a lot has to be done before it can be prepared. Goofy watches over Cowboy Pete's popcorn cart, where he shares some popcorn with Benjamin Bull and Crawford Crow. Before Goofy can refill popcorn stand, the kernels are stolen by Crawford Crow causing Goofy to enlist Benjamin to help get back the bag of kernels.
70	14	"This Cat Doesn't Swim!"	Aldina Dias	Hanah Lee Cook	Becky Cassady	October 2, 2024	305	N/A
70	14	"Funhouse-Made Costumes"	Melissa Suber	Kathleen Sarnelli Kapukchyan	David Zhu	October 2, 2024	305	N/A
This Cat Doesn't Swim: Despite Minnie trying, Bast does not want to swim at Pete the Mighty's Pool Party. Funhouse-Made Costumes: The gang has to improvise their costumes when they go missing on Halloween.
71	15	"Daisy's Dilemma"	Melissa Suber	Kim Duran	Tom Morgan	October 11, 2024	312	N/A
71	15	"The Good Luck Moon"	Melissa Suber	Kate Moran	David Zhu	October 11, 2024	312	N/A
Daisy's Dilemma: The Funhouse Friends get a call from Squeakers carrying a message from Kooky Scientist Von Drake who invites them to the Grant Jack-o'-lantern Carving Contest in Halloweenville. Upon arrival, Mayor Franken-Pete invites everyone to the pumpkin patch to pick their pumpkin to make a jack-o'-lantern out of. Everyone then carves out their jack-o'-lanterns. Once that is done, Mayor Franken-Pete states that the tiny pumpkins will be placed by the jack-o'-lantern, where the most tiny pumpkins near a jack-o'-lantern will win the contest. Daisy becomes indecisive when it comes to deciding the final vote on if Mickey's jack-o'-lantern or Minnie's jack-o'-lantern. Not wanting to make either one sad, Daisy fakes losing her tiny pumpkin and persuades Trikini to turn her into a bat. The Good Luck Moon: As Mickey and Minnie sell apple cider to Donald, Daisy, and Goofy during Autumn, they talk about their favorite holidays. Funny informs them that Ye Eun has invited them to Korea to celebrate Chuseok. Funny assumes his airplane form to take the Funhouse Friends to South Korea. Upon arrival, they see Chuseok in action as they meet up with Ye Eun who talks to them about how Chuseok is celebrated. They experience different activities like Dak SSa Umm and Ganggangsullae. Upon the Funhouse Friends being shown the feast, Ye Eun realized that she got busy enough to not make the Songpyeon. As the Songpyeon is needed, the Funhouse Friends help Ye Eun to make the Songpyeon.
72	16	"One More Thing?"	Aldina Dias	Hanah Lee Cook	Phil Mosness	October 18, 2024	318	N/A
72	16	"On a Dark and Stormy Night"	Melissa Suber	Kathleen Sarnelli Kapukchyan	Chris Otsuki	October 18, 2024	318	N/A
One More Thing?: The Funhouse Friends arrive at Funny, where they plan to go to Razzle Dazzle Dune and take Kyung Won. As he emerges from the Land of Myth and Legend door, his umma (which is Korean for "mother") advises the Funhouse Friends to allow him to bring home one thing as he has a lot of stuff in his room already. Upon arrival, they take him to the bazaar where he is unable to pick a souvenir even when they meet Merchant Hilda. When he helps to paint Merchant Hilda a sign, plays Trader Clarabelle's ring toss game, and slides down the dunes, Kyung Won still wants to find the right souvenir before they leave and becomes indecisive. On a Dark and Stormy Night: During a storm in Funhouse Forest, Goofy starts to get scared from the storm outside. His friends plan to do something to help distract Goofy from the storm. They get a call from Kooky Scientist Von Drake who invites them to a game of "Spooks and Ladders" at his laboratory in Halloweenville. Upon arrival, a storm arrives at Halloweenville as they arrive at Kooky Scientist Von Drake is harnessing wind energy to help power up his laboratory with his windmill device. As the Funhouse Friends prepares to play Spooks and Ladders with Kooky Scientist Von Drake, Fritz Chip, and Igor Dale, the power goes off with Kooky Scientist Von Drake's windmill device is blown off the roof causing everyone to think of ways to distract Goofy from the storm.
73	17	"Warbler Get Your Geetar!"	Aldina Dias	Kate Moran	Becky Cassady	November 1, 2024	319	N/A
73	17	"The Littlest Striker"	Melissa Suber	Paige Desjardins	David Zhu	November 1, 2024	319	N/A
Warbler Get Your Geetar!: The Funhouse Friends get a video call from Wanda Warbler who invites them to Sunny Gulch, where she is doing a detour during her tour. Upon arrival, they help set up a homecoming concert for Wanda Warbler as Mayor Clarabelle allows them to have the concert at the saloon while Cowboy Pete spreads the word. The Weasels hear of the news as Wheezelene plans to have a weary Sneezel sing with her. Wheezelene thinks of a reason for Wanda Warbler to sing with her by hiding Wanda Warbler's guitar G.C. so that she and Cheezel "look" for it. Minnie gives Sneezel the courage to admit to the performance delay. The Littlest Striker: The Funhouse Friends are contacted by Powerhouse Pete who invites them to Sportstopia to compete in a game of soccer. Upon arrival, they meet up with Powerhouse Pete and Clarabelle. Powerhouse Pete becomes one captain while Minnie becomes the other captain. Powerhouse Pete picks Goofy, Clarabelle, and Daisy while Minnie picks Donald and Mickey. Short one player, Referee Cuckoo Loca cannot find another player causing Minnie to pick her. Powerhouse Pete doubts that Referee Cuckoo Loca would be able to play soccer due to her size. Minnie works to find a way for Referee Cuckoo Loca to help her team and prove Powerhouse Pete wrong.
74	18	"Let's Have Fun, Fun, Fun!"	Aldina Dias	Chris Bramante	Tom Morgan	November 22, 2024	320	N/A
74	18	"Copycat Pete!"	Melissa Suber	Kathleen Sarnelli Kapukchyan	Rossen Varbanov	November 22, 2024	320	N/A
Let's Have Fun, Fun, Fun!: At the Funhouse, Daisy is listening to the record of Cosmo and the Beach Bugs. Funny reveals that Cosmo and the Beach Bugs are going to be performing live in Musicville. When the rest of the Funhouse Friends want to come along, Daisy lets them come along even though she is only one of the Funhouse Friends that likes them. Upon arrival, they find that Ludwig Von Drakenhoven, Polyphonic Pete, Captain Salty Bones, Wanda Warbler, Trolland, Cora, Farfus, Kyle, and the Weaz-Tones are in attendance. Daisy soon discovers that she isn't the only fan of Cosmo and the Beach Bugs. Copycat Pete: While tossing the ball to Pluto and Teddy, Mickey tells Teddy that he does not need to copy Pluto's tricks. The Funhouse Friends get a call from Mayor Clarabelle about a Howdy Hoedown Square Dancin' Festival in Sunny Gulch. Upon arrival, they meet up with Mayor Clarabelle as they partake in some activities. As Mickey practices his square dancing, Mayor Clarabelle hires him to be a caller. Cowboy Pete gets jealous that Mayor Clarabelle called Mickey a fun cowboy and tries to be like Mickey much to the dismay of his donkey Giddyup and before Mayor Clarabelle can ask him to play his fiddle. His copying of Mickey starts to become confusing for everyone.
75	19	"Nochebuena at the Funhouse"	Aldina Dias	Kathleen Sarnelli Kapukchyan	Becky Cassady	December 6, 2024	316	N/A
75	19	"Hanukkah at Hilda's"	Melissa Suber	Mark Drop	Tom Morgan	December 6, 2024	316	N/A
Nochebuena at the Funhouse: On Christmas Eve, Funny is decorated for the holiday. He tells Windy that he has a Christmas surprise for them. The Funhouse Friends and Teddy decorate inside Funny. Daisy learns about traditions like putting a star on the Christmas tree as Goofy wants to get some of them. Funny reveals that he has invited Panchito and Jose to visit the Funhouse Friends and share the traditions of Nochebuena like having Spanish food like tamales made in a tamalera, singing Spanish carols, and a surprise that will be revealed later at midnight. While Goofy feels that the Mexican traditions are outdoing his usual traditions as Minnie persuades him to go along with it. Hannukah at Hilda's: While decorating for Christmas Eve, the Funhouse Friends plan to deliver Christmas cookies to the Adventure Worlds. Their first stop is Winter Mountain. Upon their arrival, they give Christmas cookies to Sunny and Rosie, the Yeti, and Kyle. When a snowstorm arrives, they stop by Hilda's house and take refuge while giving her some Christmas cookies. Hilda likes the Christmas cookies and tells them about Hanukkah which her family celebrates because their Jewish. She tells them about how Hanukkah works like lighting the Hannukah menorah, having Hanukkah foods like Sufganiyah and latkes, and doing Hanukkah games.
76	20	"The Winter Mountain Art Show"	Aldina Dias	Hanah Lee Cook	Hank Tucker	December 13, 2024	321	N/A
76	20	"Hear Ye! Hear Ye!"	Melissa Suber	Kate Moran	Phil Mosness	December 13, 2024	321	N/A
The Winter Mountain Art Show: The Funhouse Friends are preparing to head to Winter Mountain to meet up with Yeti and Kyle. Daisy cannot find her special markers causing her to plan to find something else to make art. Upon arrival, they see the different kinds of art as they meet up with Yeti and Kyle who take them to their art piece. While Daisy borrows some stuff from Mickey and Yeti, the Funhouse Friends show off their different artworks. However, Kyle cannot paint his artwork since the store is out of paint. As he now cannot paint Sonia sledding down the mountain, Mickey, Daisy, and Yeti help to find another way to make his Sonia art piece. Hear Ye! Hear Ye!: Daisy gets a letter from Postmaster Pete as she informs him and Goofy about different information. She reads a letter from King Ludwig detailing an invitation to Ye Royal Summer Dance. Upon arrival, they help King Ludwig and the Weasel Jesters in setting up the decorations. Though Daisy finds out that the Royal Troubadour that he has been assigned by King Ludwig to cover for the Royal Herald who is out sick. After accompanying him, Daisy starts finds out other special reasons that are being done by Lady Clarabelle, Belle Canto, and King Ludwig mentioning to Minnie that the event is to unveil the new baby Unicorn. She soon learns why sharing the good news early as the information is leaked to the Weasel Jesters, Innkeeper Cuckoo Loca, and Farmer Pete as Minnie and the Royal Troubadour state that it is supposed to be a surprise.
77	21	"Clarabelle's Pie Dilemma"	Aldina Dias	Paige Desjardins	Chris Otsuki	January 17, 2025	322	N/A
77	21	"Daisy in Movie Magic Land"	Melissa Suber	Chris Bramante	Becky Cassady	January 17, 2025	322	N/A
Clarabelle's Pie Dilemma: At the Funhouse, the Funhouse Friends are making out a birthday card for Farfus' birthday party. Upon arriving in Majestica, they find Innkeeper Cuckoo-Loca setting up the decorations in Shirehaven. The Funhouse Friends meet up with Lady Clarabelle who is getting him from Farfus in making a large pie crust for his birthday pie. When Lady Clarabelle is stating that she is making a large banana cream pie, Goofy admits that he has a food allergy to bananas. This causes Lady Clarabelle and Farfus to find another fruit for the birthday pie that everyone can have as they visit the local orchard, Hilda's fairy square garden, and Farfus' mountain. Daisy in Movie Magic Land: The Funhouse Friends are watching a movie about a rabbit and a Tyrannosaurus where Daisy gets frightened by a dinosaur movie. Because Pluto accidentally spilled a drink on the remote control, Daisy is sucked into the movie where she meets Director Von Drake who tells her that she is in Movie Magic Land, where the movies come to life as she came out of camera operator Clarabelle's camera. Daisy learns how the movies come to life. When the rabbit actor who does his own stunts goes missing, Daisy, Director Von Drake, and Clarabelle go to look for him as they explore the different sound stages of Movie Magic Land. Once the rest of the Funhouse Friends find Daisy, the head to Movie Magic Land to reunite with her. Note: In the scene where Mickey changes channels, scenes from other Disney Jr. shows are seen, including Sofia the First, Mickey Mouse Mixed-Up Adventures, The Lion Guard, Firebuds, Alice's Wonderland Bakery, and Spidey and His Amazing Friends.
78	22	"Goofy and Pluto Meet Teddy-stein"	Aldina Dias	Kate Moran	Rossen Varbanov	January 24, 2025	324	N/A
78	22	"Stick to the Plan!"	Melissa Suber	Paige Desjardins	Hank Tucker	January 24, 2025	324	N/A
Goofy and Pluto Meet Teddy-stein: During a storm in Funhouse Forest, the Funhouse Friends are invited to Halloweenville to see Kooky Scientist Von Drake who will show off his Electro Harmonia invention. Upon arrival, Kooky Scientist Von Drake shows off the electronic harmonia, where too many electricity plays too many notes. After Kooky Scientist Von Drake does some adjustments that causes a blackout in his lab, Fritz Chip and Igor Dale reveal that the sparks have frightened off Teddy. Everyone looks for Teddy in Kooky Scientist Von Drake's house. Goofy and Pluto find Teddy in the basement as Kooky Scientist Von Drake's way of staying calm comes in handy. Stick to the Plan!: The Funhouse Friends are preparing for a camping trip in the Land of Myth and Legend as Mickey has planned every activity. Upon arrival, they start by fishing at Care-abelle's pond where Care-abelle reveals that she replaced the fishes with wishes where Goofy accidentally draining it revealed pretty rocks. The next activity is bird watching in the primeval forest, where Woodsman Willie tries to be quiet only to end up sneezing. Then they plan to watch the sunset on top of Shadow Mountain, where they get lost and a Dokkaebi leads them to a mountain of yaksik. Mickey finds that each of the plans that they tried to stick to their plan ends up going awry as he is told by his friends that they did have memorable moments along the way.
79	23	"Quiet Ness"	Aldina Dias	Kathleen Sarnelli Kapukchyan	Becky Cassady	January 31, 2025	315	N/A
79	23	"Happy Pal-entine's Day!"	Melissa Suber	Kate Moran	David Zhu	January 31, 2025	315	N/A
Quiet Ness: As Pluto plays with Teddy, Mickey informs Minnie about a call they got from Captain Salty Bones about performing music. Upon arrival in the Adventure Sea Islands, the Funhouse Friends meet up with Captain Salty Bones and Cora tell her that they will be meeting a sea monster named Agnessa "Ness". First Mate Cuckoo-Loca delivers a letter to Captain Salty Bones stating that she won't be attending the music party as she does not like loud sounds. The Funhouse Friends quietly head to a foggy area of Big Fish Swamp and get through it to find Ness and tell her that they won't play loud music. Even when she is found, Ness states that a quiet music party would not be fun causing the Funhouse Friends to come up with a solution. Happy Pal-entine's Day!: At the Funhouse, Funny finds that the Funhouse Friends are working on a Valentine's Day or as they call it Pal-entine's Day to celebrate their pals. When they find that they are out of crayons, Funny suggests that they go to Crayon World as they plan to make their Pal-entine's Day cards there. Upon arrival, Funny suggest that they big cards that they can walk through and play in. Everyone works on their big Pal-entine's Day cards. Donald's gopher drawing comes to life causing Pluto to chase after it which ends up affecting the different drawings that the Funhouse friends have created.
80	24	"A Fish Called Wanda Warbler"	Aldina Dias	Chris Bramante	Phil Mosness	February 7, 2025	325	N/A
80	24	"It's a Small World!"	Melissa Suber	Kathleen Sarnelli Kapukchyan	Chris Otsuki	February 7, 2025	325	N/A
A Fish Called Wanda Warbler: The Funhouse Friends get a call from Wanda Warbler who tells them that Sunny Gulch is too hot for them to jam together and wants to find a place to cool off. Minnie invites her to come to Underwater Ocean World to cool off. Upon meeting with Wanda Warbler at the top of the Stairs to Anywhere, they enter Underwater Ocean World, where Wanda tries out her mermaid tail. As they swim together, Minnie advises everyone to stay together as they arrive at Octo-Pete's Radtacular Reef. When everyone splits up to different activities, Minnie and Wanda go to the Singy-Singy Song Cave. Wanda follows a glowworm and wanders off, meeting Seabiscuit and Bubbles. It's a Small World!: Minnie feeds Pluto and Teddy some dog treats as Minnie has Pluto share with Teddy. Goofy tells Minnie that the fruit on the Enchanted Tree in the Enchanted Rainforest is ripe. Upon arrival, the Funhouse Friends arrive at the Enchanted Tree as Donald and Goofy harvest the mango-nana-melon fruit by pulling the vines. Once that is done, they eat the mango-nana-melon as Goofy wants to harvest more of the fruit. The Enchanted Tree gives the Funhouse Friends a sign that it does not want to share the fruit. When Donald takes the mango-nana-melon back from the ants, the Enchanted Tree shrinks them to insect size. They meet an ant named Ana as they help carry the mango-nana-melon to her ant colony while learning about them.
81	25	"Bunny Nopes"	Aldina Dias	Kathleen Sarnelli Kapukchyan	David Zhu	February 14, 2025	323	N/A
81	25	"Kitten in the Castle"	Melissa Suber	Hanah Lee Cook	Tom Morgan	February 14, 2025	323	N/A
Bunny Nopes: Funny builds a snow mound where he has one big and one small as Donald hasn't done snow tubing before. Donald attempts to do the big snow mound instead of the small snow mound as he is a beginner. Funny gets a call from Yeti stating that he is teaching snowboard lessons on Winter Mountain as Daisy hasn't snowboarded before. Upon arrival, they meet up with Yeti who teaches them how to snowboard. Upon mastering the bunny slopes, Yeti states that they must master the bunny slopes where Hilda, Sunny, and Rosie are first. Though Daisy still wants to snowboard down the Black Diamond and insists that she is a natural until she finds out why Yeti and Hilda are right about it as Yeti comes to her aid. Kitten in the Castle: The Funhouse Friends are invited by Mayor Franken-Pete to Halloweenville to see the changes to his castle. Upon arrival, they meet up with Mayor Franken-Pete who starts by showing him his bat-winged black kitten Lyss in the ballroom. Lyss is shown to have a lot of energy as her silliness gets her into trouble, but she wants to explore the castle, which has many rooms. As Mayor Franken-Pete leaves to go approve the new trick-or-treat bags, the Funhouse Friends watch over Lyss. When Lyss escapes from the ballroom, the Funhouse Friends must find Lyss when she gets lost and they must help Mayor Franken-Pete find her.
82	26	"Ballet Fun"	Aldina Dias	Hannah Lee Cook	Becky Cassady	March 7, 2025	326	N/A
82	26	"Sitting Ducks"	Melissa Suber	Paige Desjardins	David Zhu	March 7, 2025	326	N/A
Ballet Fun: The Funhouse Friends are prepared for taking some dance classes in Sportstopia. While Minnie and Daisy will learn tap dancing from Horace, Mickey, Donald, and Goofy will learn ballet from Hilda. Upon arrival, they each meet up with Horace and Hilda. As Hilda teaches ballet at the grand theater, Mickey and Goofy master the position while Goofy has difficulty matching the position. During more of the ballet lessons, Goofy tries to struggle with the other ballet moves as he slowly masters them. Sitting Ducks: The Funhouse Friends are preparing some Easter baskets for King Ludwig's Big Easter Hunt in Majestica. They get a call from King Ludwig stating that he needs them to also watch his grand-nephews who are coming to visit him. Upon arrival in the town of Shirehaven, the Funhouse Friends meet up with King Ludwig and his grand-nephews Hueth, Deweth, and Loueth as they teach them some Easter activities like the Egg and Spoon Race overseen by Farmer Pete, a basket-making activity held by Lady Clarabelle, and partaking in the Easter Egg Hunt held by King Ludwig. Hueth, Deweth, and Loueth struggle to learn each Easter activity as the Funhouse Friends help them out.
83	27	"The Golden Mango"	Aldina Dias	Mark Drop	Tom Morgan & Rossen Varbanov	March 14, 2025	327	N/A
83	27	"Minnie and the Mystic Crystal"	Melissa Suber	Chris Bramante	Rossen Varbanov	March 14, 2025	327	N/A
The Golden Mango: The Funhouse Friends get a video call from their monkey friend Naatu Bandar in India who has received a Golden Mango statue from his Uncle Sanjay. Though the statue's stand is there, the Golden Mango Statue is gone as it is said to contain special powers. The Funhouse Friends take an Adventure Door to India, where they help to find the Golden Mango statue throughout India. Kulfi Chip and Mishti Dale who mistake the Golden Mango statue for a golden acorn and compete with Daisy in claiming it in a Bollywood dance-off. While Goofy tries some medu vada from the local vendor Hilda, Donald gets his hand stuck underneath an Indian elephant. Minnie and the Mystic Crystal: While tending to the garden in front of Funny, Minnie finds a message from Hibiscus Hilda who informs them that the Snow Princess of Winter Mountain is coming to Fairy Square for a visit as she needs their help to get everything ready for her arrival. Upon their arrival, the Funhouse Friends in their fairy forms help Hibiscus Hilda tidy up the garden and prepare a special gift for the Snow Princess. Wanting to help find a special gift, Minnie is advised by Hibiscus Hilda to put some thought into it. Minnie hears about the Mystic Crystal that can be found in Fairy Forest to go with the crystals that the Snow Princess has. Minnie and Daisy follow the trail of the Mystic Crystal and bring it back to Fairy Square until a blizzard heralding the Snow Princess's arrival breaks it.
84	28	"Steamboat Funny"	Aldina Dias	Kathleen Sarnelli Kapukchyan	Hank Tucker	March 21, 2025	328	N/A
84	28	"The Emerald Emperor's Journey"	Melissa Suber	Kate Moran	Phil Mosness	March 21, 2025	328	N/A
Steamboat Funny: While playing with a toy steamboat, Mickey recalls the time when he was on the steamboat with his old friend Piccolo Pete. Funny calls up Piccolo Pete as Mickey wants to do the steamboat ride again only for Piccolo Pete to mention that Sally Steamboat is no longer in working condition. Funny offers to be the steamboat as the Funhouse Friends head to Big Fish Swamp in the Adventure Sea Islands to meet up with Piccolo Pete. Upon arrival, Funny transforms into a steamboat as the Funhouse Friends pick up Piccolo Pete at Big Fish Swamp. As the sailing begins, Piccolo Pete brings his instruments for the Funhouse Friends to play only to find that he had accidentally grabbed First Mate Cuckoo-Loca's bag of clothes for her birdbath boat tour causing everyone to improvise with the items around them. The Emerald Emperor's Journey: While having a picnic outside of Funny, the Funhouse Friends receive a package from Postmaster Pete. It is a music containing a message to join the Emerald Emperor in the Land of Myth and Legend. Upon arrival, the Funhouse Friends meet up with the Emerald Emperor who is a kid that has heard about the Funhouse Friends' exploits in the Land of Myth and Legend. He would like them to go to on a hiking expedition to Flowers and Fruit Mountain to find the Emerald Egg Gem which is said to have the ability to help anyone learn more important stuff. As they hike through Flowers and Fruit Forest, they do things like help a baby monkey reach a fruit who later helps them get across a deep ravine. Afterwards, they look for the Emerald Egg that might be the size of any egg.
85	29	"Minnie's One-of-a-Kind Picnic"	Aldina Dias	Paige Desjardins	Chris Otsuki	April 18, 2025	329	N/A
85	29	"Daisy's in a Fix"	Melissa Suber	Hanah Lee Cook	Becky Cassady	April 18, 2025	329	N/A
Minnie's One-of-a-Kind Picnic: Minnie has prepared the food for a perfect picnic for her friends....until it starts raining in Funhouse Forest. Funny suggests finding a sunny location behind one of the Adventure Doors. Due to it being foggy and rainy in the Adventure Sea Islands locations of Giant Crab Island and Big Fish Swamp respectively, the Funhouse Friends head to Majestica as it is currently sunny. Upon arrival, the items that Minnie packed end up being given up like the strawberries that Lady Clarabelle needs to make a pie for King Ludwig, a blanket to help Farmer Pete's pigs take their nap, and the muffins to feed Farfus after flower-picking with his adoptive family. Daisy's in a Fix: Funny informs the Funhouse Friends that they are invited to a hoedown in the ghost town of Rainbow Ridge near Sunny Gulch. Daisy does fix the Stairs to Anywhere when it gets stuck. Upon arrival, they meet the ghost Madi who states that they need help sprucing up the place for their Sunny Gulch neighbors because the local ghosts can't pick up anything. Daisy works to fix up the mine cart with the ghost goat accompanying her and is too afraid to ask her frieds for help. While looking for mine cart-fixing tools, Daisy gets delayed with helping Minnie fixing the door to the general store, painting flower pictures on the wall of the hotel, and polishing the dance hall floor needed for the dancing competition.
86	30	"Mickey and the Cozy Fleece"	Aldina Dias	Chris Bramante	David Zhu	April 25, 2025	330	N/A
86	30	"Now You See Zee Doop, Now You Don't"	Melissa Suber	Kathleen Sarnelli Kapukchyan	Tom Morgan & Phil Mosness	April 25, 2025	330	N/A
Mickey and the Cozy Fleece: During a rainy day in Funhouse Forest, the Funhouse Friends are relaxed except for Pluto who is having a hard time getting cozy and nothing is helping. Funny gets the idea to have the Funhouse Friends to look for the Cozy Fleece in the Land of Myth and Legend. Upon arrival, they are told by Gorgon Zola that the Cozy Fleece is with Sally Sphinx on Riddle Island. The Funhouse Friends are taken to the Mythic Dock, where Funny takes them to Riddle Island. After getting through choppy waters, the Funhouse Friends arrive on Riddle Island make their way to Sally Sphinx's lair, where she states that they must solve her riddle to earn it. Now You See Zee Doop, Now You Don't: While birdwatching, Daisy is told by Minnie that a blue jay needs to get familiar with her to accept her berry. Once that was done, the Funhouse Friends get a call from Lunar Clarabelle who invites them to Asteroid Pete's Cave of Amazement and is bringing her friend Zee Doop as Goofy gets nervous about meeting her for the first time. Upon arrival in Outer Space, the Funhouse Friends meet up with Lunar Clarabelle and find that Zee Doop has disappeared due to her being nervous and turned invisible when meeting new people. Everyone splits up to find Zee Doop. Each time they get close upon seeing things move by themselves, Zee Doop keeps evading them until Goofy manages to find her as they learn that they have some things in common. Note: This is the series finale.
