= Agra Hadig =

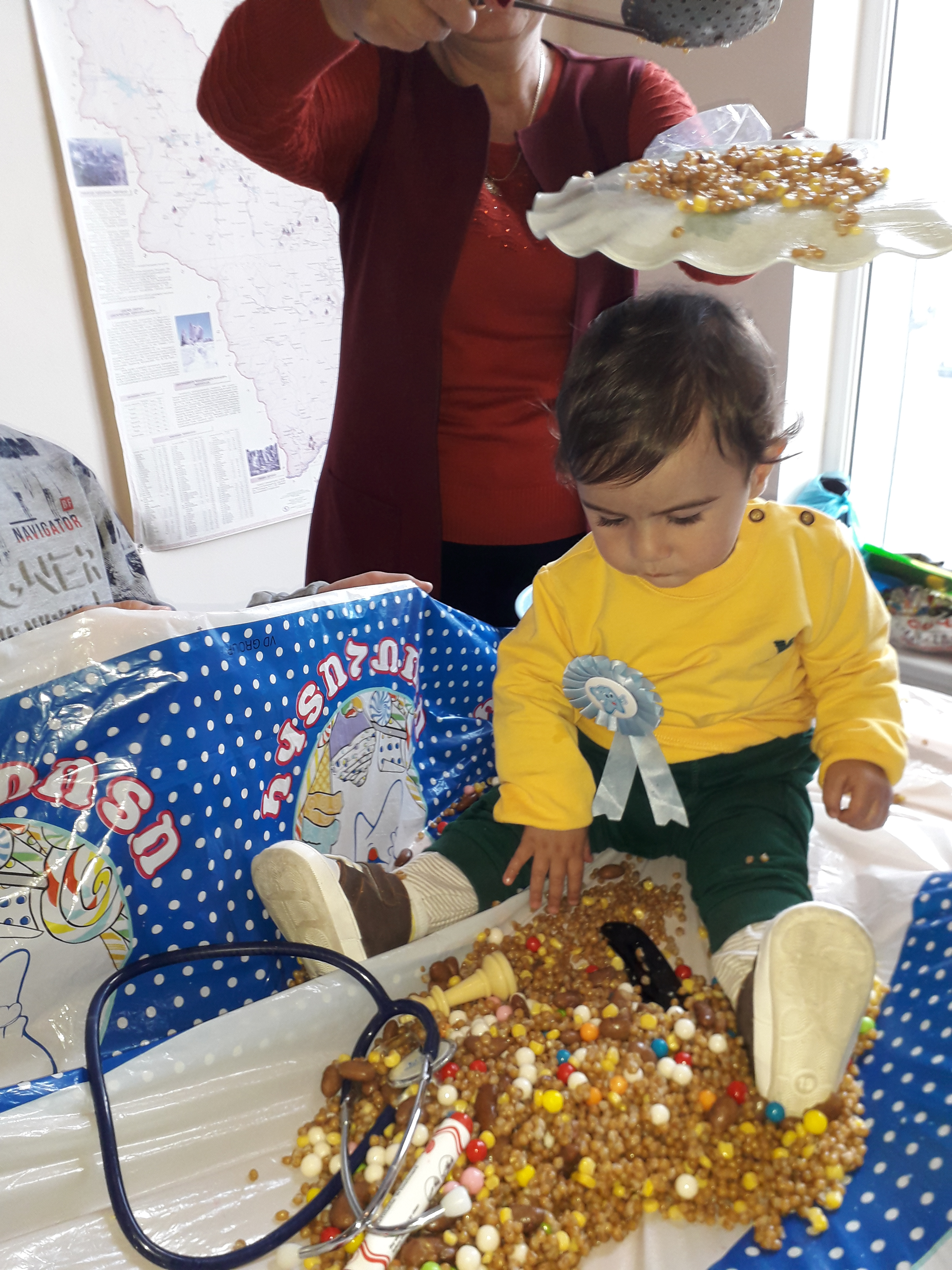

Agra Hadig (Armenian: Ագրա Հադիգ) or Atam Hatik (Armenian: Ատամ Հատիկ) is a ceremony in Armenian culture commemorating the first tooth coming in of a newborn baby. In the ceremony, the young baby is set before several symbolic items relating to different professional vocations. Whichever item the child first selects is meant to indicate what profession the child will likely gravitate towards as they grow up. Traditionally, the mother next sprinkles wheat over the child to wish for fruitfulness. The combination is meant to represent the spiritual connection between Agra (teeth) and Hadig (wheat).

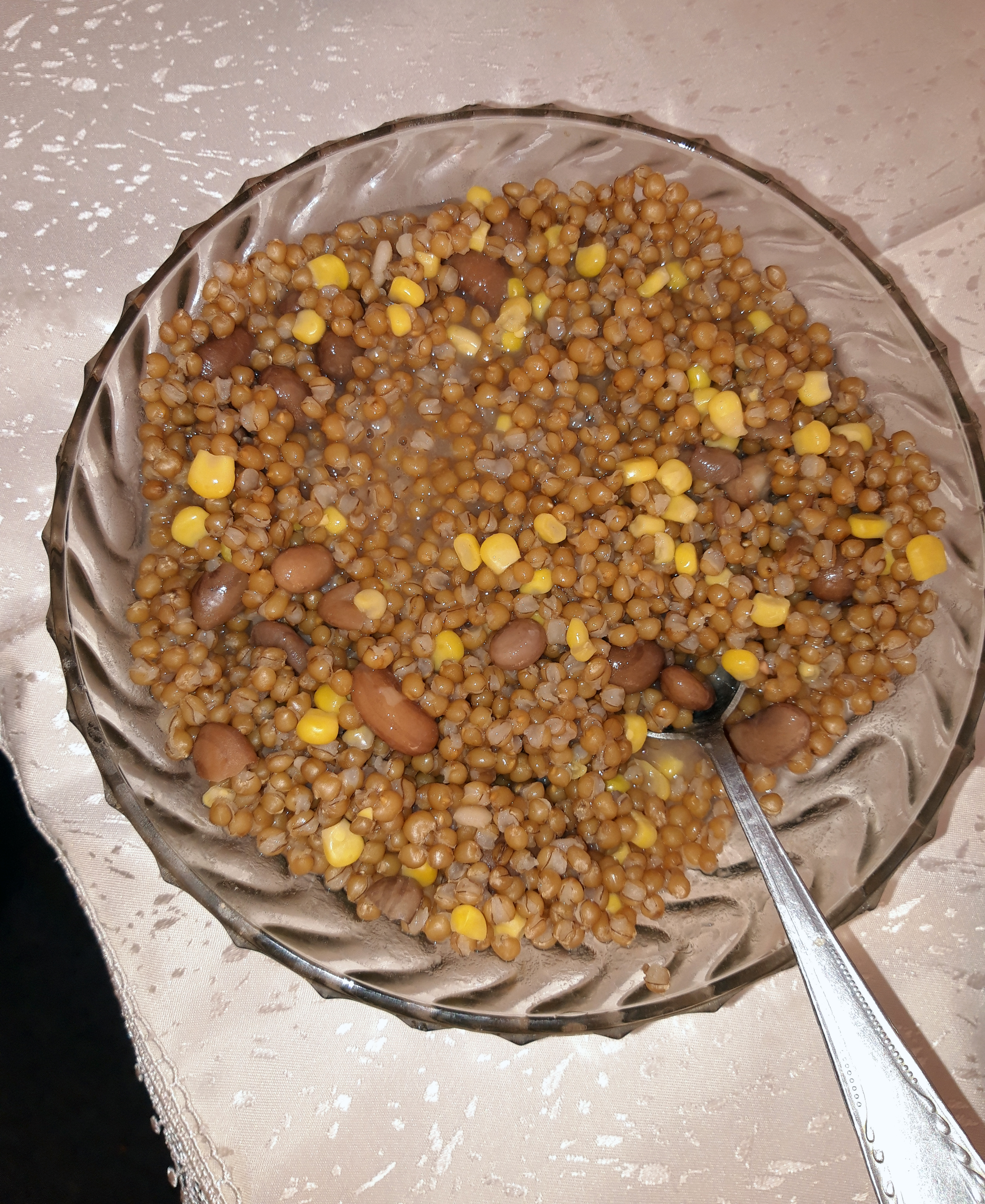
Agra Hadig

The tradition is said to go back several hundred years but is most recently documented in the 19th century, originally as a divination to predict the gender of the child's next sibling. Under Soviet rule and the eventual Armenian diaspora the tradition changed to predicting the profession of the child in adult life.

Objects include: book for scholar, money for finance, jewelry for jeweler, spool of thread for tailor.

Tradition is to cook/boil wheat grains, which symbolize the "teeth". A thin veil is held over the child's head, and the grains are sprinkled over them, on top of the veil for good luck.

Then, the cooked wheat is eaten by the party attendees, with an assortment of toppings they can put on their bowl of wheat such as sugar, cinnamon, pomegranate seeds. Modern versions also include sprinkles, chocolate chips, mini M&Ms and the like.

== See also ==
- Zhuazhou
- Doljanchi
