= Zhuazhou =

Chinese ritual held on a child's first birthday

Chinese name
- Traditional Chinese: 抓週
- Simplified Chinese: 抓周
Transcriptions
Standard Mandarin
- Hanyu Pinyin: zhuāzhōu
- IPA: [ʈʂwá.ʈʂóʊ]

Vietnamese name
- Vietnamese alphabet: thôi nôi

Zhuazhou (Chinese: 抓週; lit. 'catch at first birthday') is a Chinese ritual held at a child's first birthday party. The parents put various objects before the child. Parents will often put objects that symbolize career choices or personality traits. The child's choice is used to forecast its future. It is said that this custom can be dated back to the Northern and Southern dynasties (420–589). Yan Zhitui in his book Yanshi jiaxun 顏氏家訓 ("The Family Instructions of Master Yan") documented a custom that is very similar to Zhuazhou today. The earliest written record of this custom can be traced back to the Song dynasty (960–1279). It is portrayed in a well-known scene in the novel Dream of the Red Chamber.

== History ==
=== Origin ===
During the Northern and Southern Dynasties. There is a clear record of the ceremony of Zhuazhou in the Yanshi Jiaxun of Yan Zhitui of Northern Qi. When many writings talk about the history of the Zhuazhou custom, they all say that this custom has been popular in the Jiangnan area (regions south of the Yangtze River) of China at least during the Northern and Southern Dynasties, and gradually spread throughout China during the Sui and Tang Dynasties.

=== Evolution ===
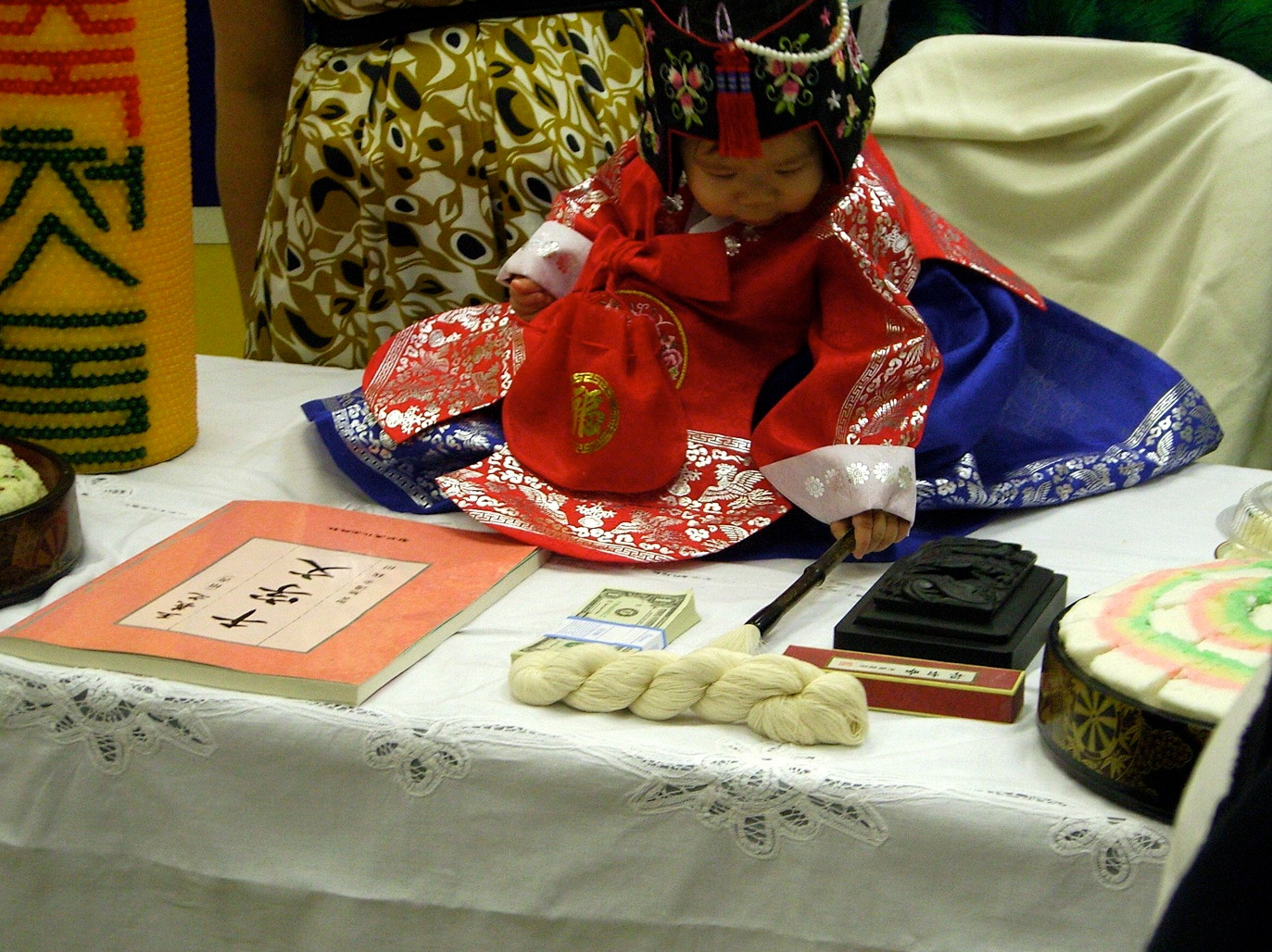
Doljabi - Korean style Zhuazhou

In the Tang and Song dynasties, this custom had spread from the south of the Yangtze River to the land of China and gradually became popular throughout China. At that time it was called Shizui or Zhouzui. This kind of ceremony was held more solemnly by the royal family, with more complicated procedures and more styles of objects.

In the Yuan and Ming dynasties, this custom became more popular and was called Jiyang. It was only in the Qing Dynasty that it was called Zhuazhou and Shizhou. However, there is a huge gap between the imperial family and the folks, and there are also great differences in etiquette levels and objects.

At the end of the Qing Dynasty and the beginning of the Republic of China, this kind of Zhuazhou ceremony was still popular among the people in Beijing. But this kind of etiquette becomes less solemn, and the host will not invite guests to hold a banquet. Relatives will come to the home spontaneously on this day to come to congratulate with small gifts. The gifts are usually food and toys.

After the 20th century, some cities in southern China and many cities in the north still held the ceremony of Zhuazhou.

== Procedure and implications ==
=== Procedure ===
On the child's first birthday, the parents freshen up their child and worship the ancestors to pray for the healthy growth of their child. Then the parents choose a spacious room, put two square tables in the middle, spread cloth or mats on them, put the prepared grab objects on one end of the table in an arc. Next, the parents hold the child at the other end of the table, let the baby grasp the objects. The parents can predict the child's interests, hobbies and possible occupations in the future according to the grabbed objects. No matter what object the child grasps, parents should say a few auspicious words. The ceremony is mainly for the elders to have high hopes and best wishes for the children.

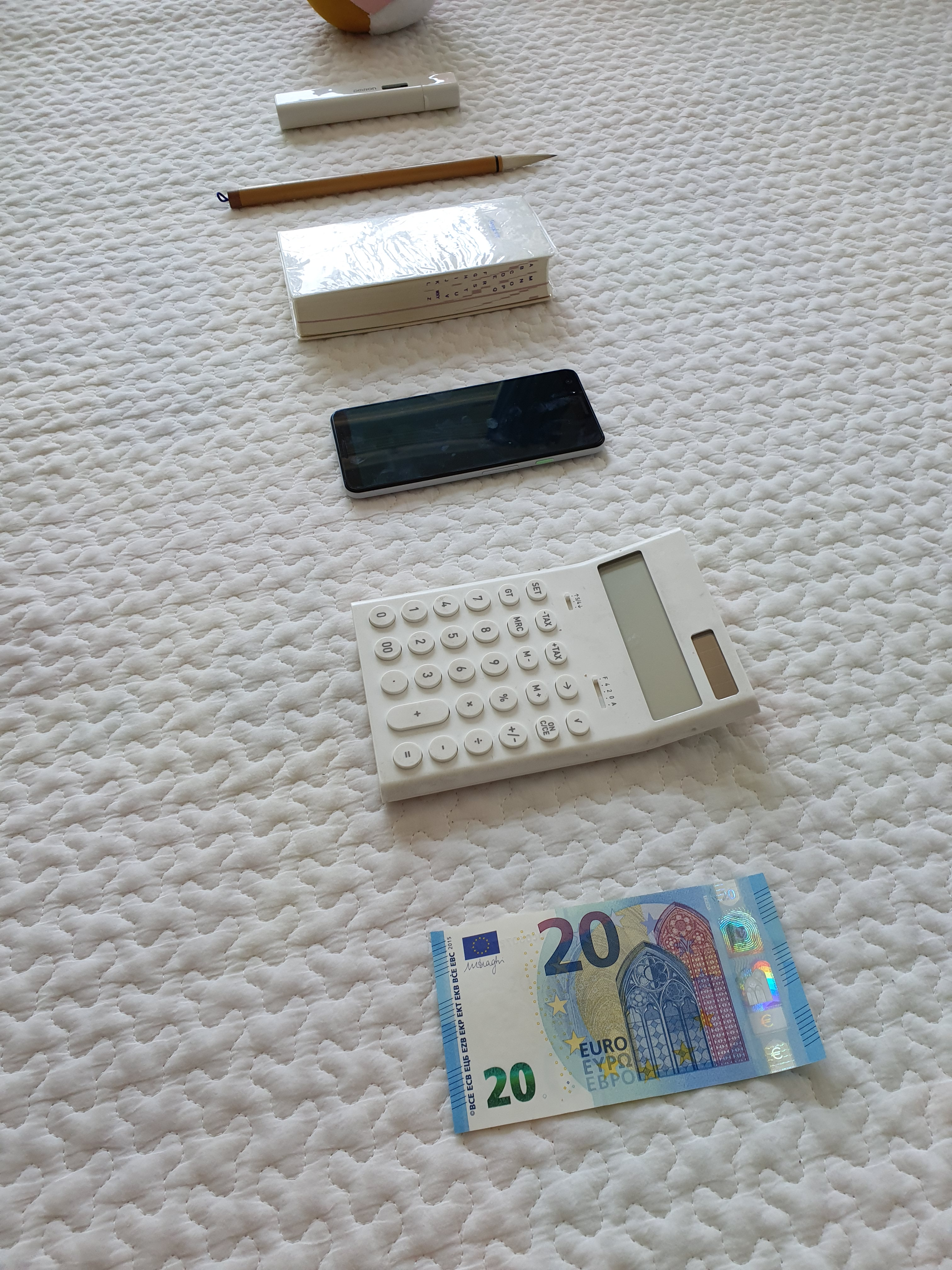
Erabitori - Japanese way of "Zhua Zhou"

=== Fortunetelling ===
Each of the common object to catch has a different implication of future vocation or wealth of the child:

1. Book: scholar

2. Pen and ink: writer, reporter

3. Seal: high official

4. Abacus/calculator: businessperson or accountant

5. Money: affluent

6. Ruler: lawyer, judge

7. Shallot: intelligence (Shallot and intelligence share the same pronunciation "Cong" in Chinese)

8. Garlic: a good head for figures (Garlic and calculation share the same pronunciation "Suan" in Chinese)

9. Straw: agriculturist

10. Sword: officer, police

11. Stethoscope: doctor, nurse

== Related ==
- It is known as Thôi nôi in Vietnam.
- It is known as Doljabi (돌잡이) during the Doljanchi or first year celebration in Korea.
- It is known as Erabitori (選び取り) in Japan.
- The same is performed during Tusaukeser (тұсаукесер; Kazakh celebration of a child's first steps). It was borrowed during the Soviet Union, when many North Koreans were exiled to Kazakhstan.
- Also related is the Armenian first birthday ritual of Agra Hadig to pick fortuitous objects.
- A similar function called Pallada is performed in parts of Kozhikode and Malappuram (districts of the state of Kerala), India. Pallada is performed after the first tooth erupts. Among the articles kept is Ada - a sweet dumpling wrapped in plantain leaf that gives the function its name.
- A similar tradition is practiced in the Maltese islands, known as Il-Quċċija, where a variety of symbolic objects are placed before a child on their first birthday, and the first item the child chooses is said to predict some aspect of their future career or lifestyle.
- A similar tradition has been practiced since ancient times in Bulgaria, known as Proshtapulnik (Прощъпулник). It's celebration of a child's first steps.
