= Formosa (disambiguation) =

Formosa is a former name for the island of Taiwan.

Formosa may also refer to:

== Places and jurisdictions ==
=== Asia ===
- Republic of Formosa, a short-lived republic in 1895 on the island of Formosa (also known as Taiwan)
- Dutch Formosa, the period of colonial Dutch government on Formosa (Taiwan), lasting from 1624 to 1662
- Spanish Formosa, a Spanish colony established in the north of Taiwan from 1626 to 1642
- Taiwan under Japanese rule, 1895 to 1945
- Formosa Strait, historic name for the Taiwan Strait
- Mount Formosa, a colonial-era name to a group of contiguous hills near Kanhangad, Kerala, India

=== Europe ===
- Ria Formosa, a lagoon in the Algarve
- Formosa Island, Berkshire, England, UK

=== South America ===
- Formosa Province, Argentina
  - Formosa, Argentina, the capital of its namesake province
  - Roman Catholic Diocese of Formosa, Argentina
- Formosa, Goiás, Brazil (near Brasília in Goiás State)
  - Roman Catholic Diocese of Formosa, Brazil, formerly a Territorial Prelature

=== North America ===
- Formosa, Ontario, Canada

=== Africa ===
- Formosa (Guinea-Bissau), one of the Bissagos Islands, Africa
- Formosa Flora, an earlier name for Bioko, Equatorial Guinea.
- Bahia Formosa, an earlier name for Plettenberg Bay, South Africa
- Formosa Peak, South Africa

== Other uses ==
=== Taiwan-related ===
- Formosa Magazine, a magazine of the Tangwai movement
- Formosa Petrochemical, an energy company in Taiwan
- Formosa Plastics Corp, a major corporation in Taiwan
- Formosa Television, a major television network in Taiwan

=== Other ===
- Formosa (band), a German hard rock band
- Formosa (film), a 2005 comedy
- Formosa (horse), winner of the English Fillies Triple Crown
- Formosa (surname), a surname common in Malta, Spain, Portugal and other Mediterranean countries
- Formosa Cafe, a famous restaurant in Hollywood, California
- Formosa, a fictional country located on the island of Taiwan, whose culture was invented by George Psalmanazar as a hoax
- Bosque Formosa Esporte Clube, a Brazilian football (soccer) club
- Amanita muscaria var. formosa, a variety of the fly agaric mushroom
- Nectouxia formosa, a species of flowering plant belonging to the family Solanaceae
- Formosa (bacterium), a genus of Flavobacteriaceae
- The proper name of the star HD 100655

== See also ==
- Formosa (surname)
- Formosan (disambiguation)
- Formoso (disambiguation)
- A Famosa, a colonial fortress in Malacca, Malaysia; controlled by Portugal (1511–1641), Netherlands (1641–1795), Britain (1795–1807)
- JW Formoza, a Polish military unit
