= Taiwanese =

Taiwanese may refer to:

- of or related to Taiwan
  - Culture of Taiwan
  - Geography of Taiwan
  - Taiwanese cuisine
- Languages of Taiwan
  - Formosan languages
  - Taiwanese Hokkien, also known as the Taiwanese language
- Taiwanese people, residents of Taiwan or people of Taiwanese descent
  - Taiwanese indigenous peoples, or Formosan peoples, formerly called Taiwanese aborigines
  - Han Taiwanese, Taiwanese people of full or partial ethnic Han descent
    - Hoklo Taiwanese, Taiwanese people of full or partial ethnic Hoklo descent

== See also ==
- Formosan
- Taiwanese language (disambiguation)
- Republic of China (disambiguation)
