= Formosan =

Formosan may refer to various things associated with the island of Taiwan (formerly called Formosa):

- Taiwanese people who lived on the island before 1945, and their descendants
- Taiwanese indigenous peoples, descendants of inhabitants of the island before Chinese settlement
- Formosan languages, the languages of the indigenous people of the island
- Formosan black bear, a species endemic to the island
- Formosan Mountain Dog, a breed of dog commonly referred to as Formosan
- Formosan Rock Macaque, a species of macaque monkey found in Taiwan

== See also ==
- Taiwanese (disambiguation)
- Formosa (disambiguation)
