= Xiao Wulai Waterfall =

Waterfall in Fuxing, Taoyuan City, Taiwan

Xiao Wulai Waterfall 小烏來瀑布
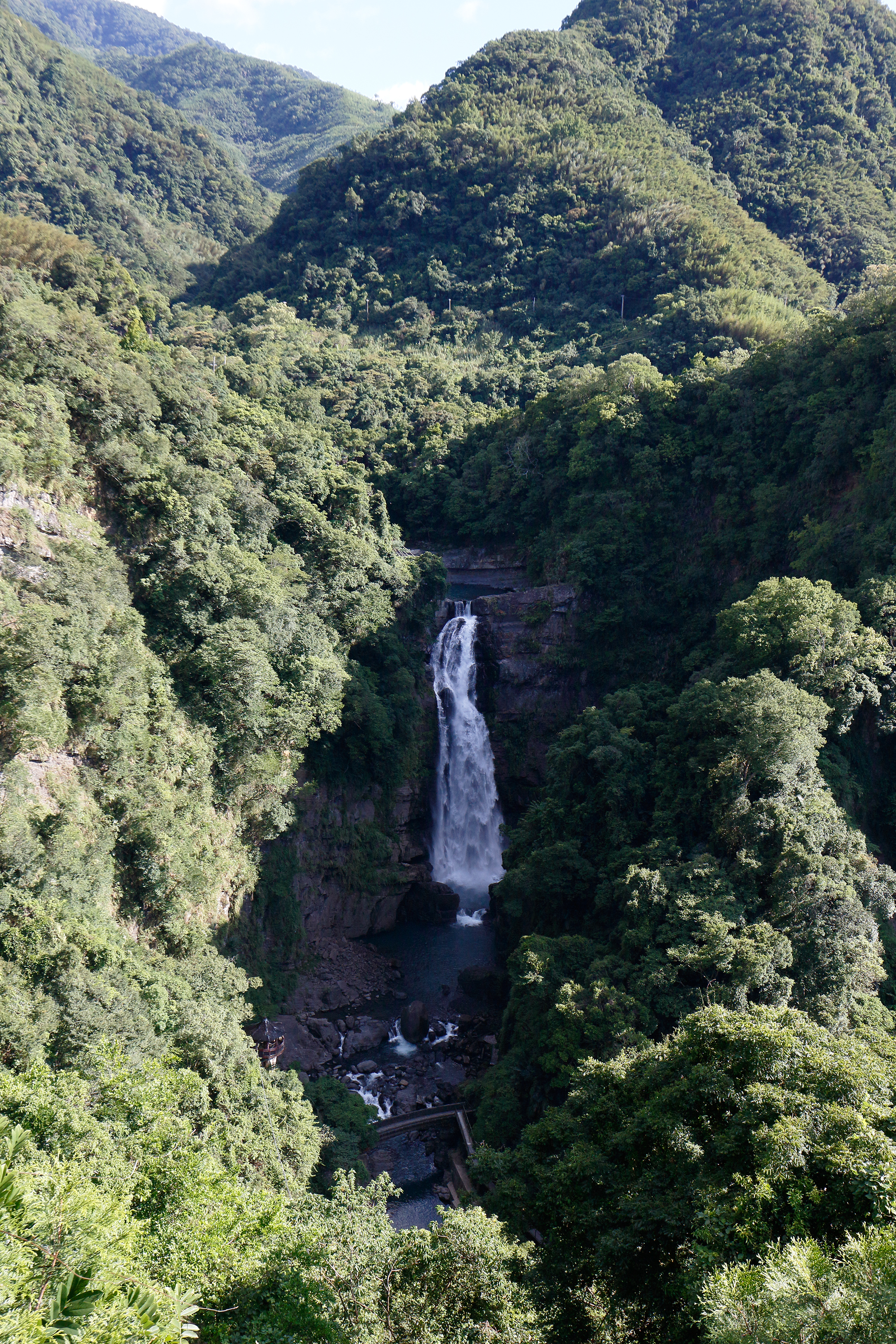
- Interactive map of Xiao Wulai Waterfall 小烏來瀑布
- Location: Fuxing, Taoyuan City, Taiwan
- Coordinates: 24°47′26.20″N 121°22′29.70″E
- Type: Waterfall
- Total height: 55 m (180 ft)

The Xiao Wulai Waterfall or Little Wulai Waterfall (Chinese: 小烏來瀑布; pinyin: Xiǎo Wūlái Pùbù) is a waterfall in Fuxing District, Taoyuan, Taiwan. The height of the waterfall is around 55 meters. The waterfall is often confused with the Wulai Waterfall of New Taipei City.

== Skywalk ==
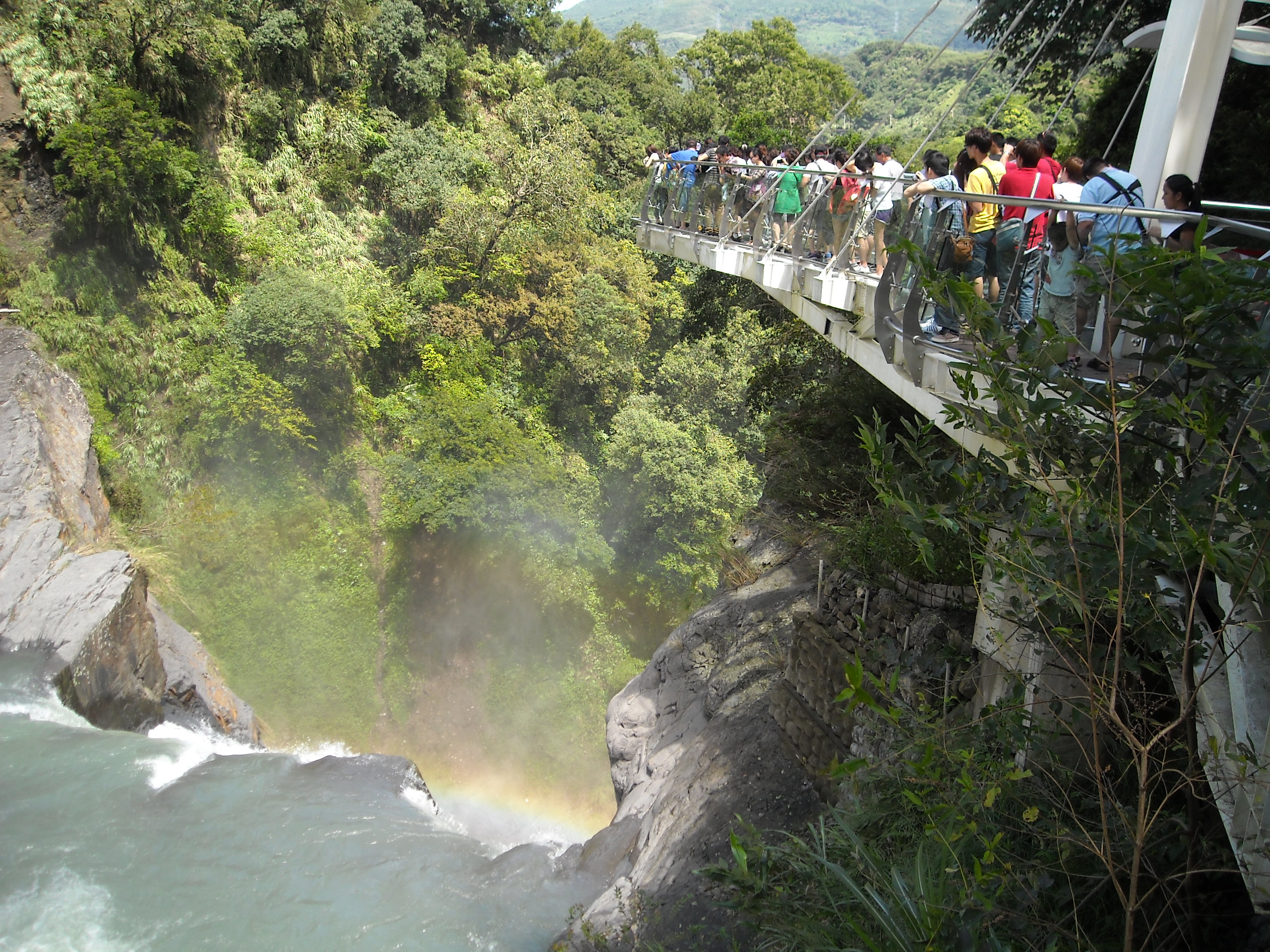
Skywalk in Xiaowulai.

Xiao Wulai Skywalk is suspended above the Xiao Wulai Waterfall. The walkway extended in the sky for 11 meters. Standing on the glass platform, 70 meters high above the bottom of waterfall, tourists can admire the scenery of waterfall.
