= Formosa arctica =

Scientific classification
- Domain: Bacteria
- Kingdom: Pseudomonadati
- Phylum: Bacteroidota
- Class: Flavobacteriia
- Order: Flavobacteriales
- Family: Flavobacteriaceae
- Genus: Formosa
- Species: F. arctica

Binomial name
- Formosa arctica Kwon et al. 2014

Type strain
- IMCC9485

Bacterium

Formosa arctica is a Gram-negative, chemoheterotrophic and strictly aerobic bacterium from the genus Formosa which has been isolated from seawater from the Arctic Ocean.
