= Formosa sediminum =

Scientific classification
- Domain: Bacteria
- Kingdom: Pseudomonadati
- Phylum: Bacteroidota
- Class: Flavobacteriia
- Order: Flavobacteriales
- Family: Flavobacteriaceae
- Genus: Formosa
- Species: F. sediminum

Binomial name
- Formosa sediminum Han et al. 2020

Type strain
- PS13

Bacterium

Formosa sediminum is a Gram-negative and aerobic bacterium from the genus Formosa which has been isolated from sediments from the coast of Jeju Island. Formosa sediminum has the ability to degrade starch. Cells are catalase and oxidase positive.
