= Jiguopai Old Church =

Church in Tamsui, Taipei, Taiwan

- 基國派老教堂
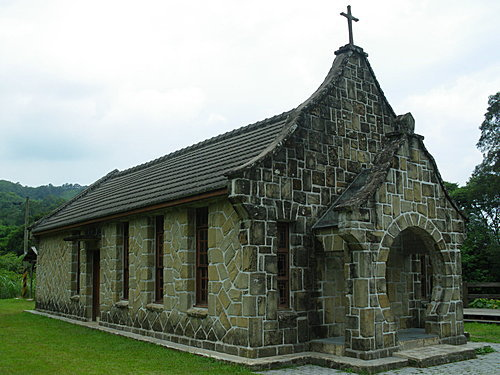

Religion
- Affiliation: Catholic

Location
- Location: Fuxing, Taoyuan City, Taiwan
- Interactive map of Jiguopai Old Church
- Coordinates: 24°50′24.5″N 121°20′51.4″E

Architecture
- Type: church
- Completed: 1964

The Jiguopai Old Church (traditional Chinese: 基國派老教堂; simplified Chinese: 基国派老教堂; pinyin: Jīguópài Lǎo Jiàotáng) is a church in Sanmin Village, Fuxing District, Taoyuan City, Taiwan.

== History ==
The church was built by Huang Rong-quan, a Presbyterian Church priest in Taiwan, in 1964 with a group of Atayal people. It underwent reconstruction after 2000 after its roof collapsed and damaged the building. In 2004, the building was designated as a historical monument by the Taoyuan County Government. In 2013, the church was selected as one of the 100 Religious Attractions in Taiwan by the Ministry of the Interior.

== Architecture ==
The church roof is supported by woods with round door at the entrance with Chinese style.

== See also ==
- List of tourist attractions in Taiwan
- Christianity in Taiwan
