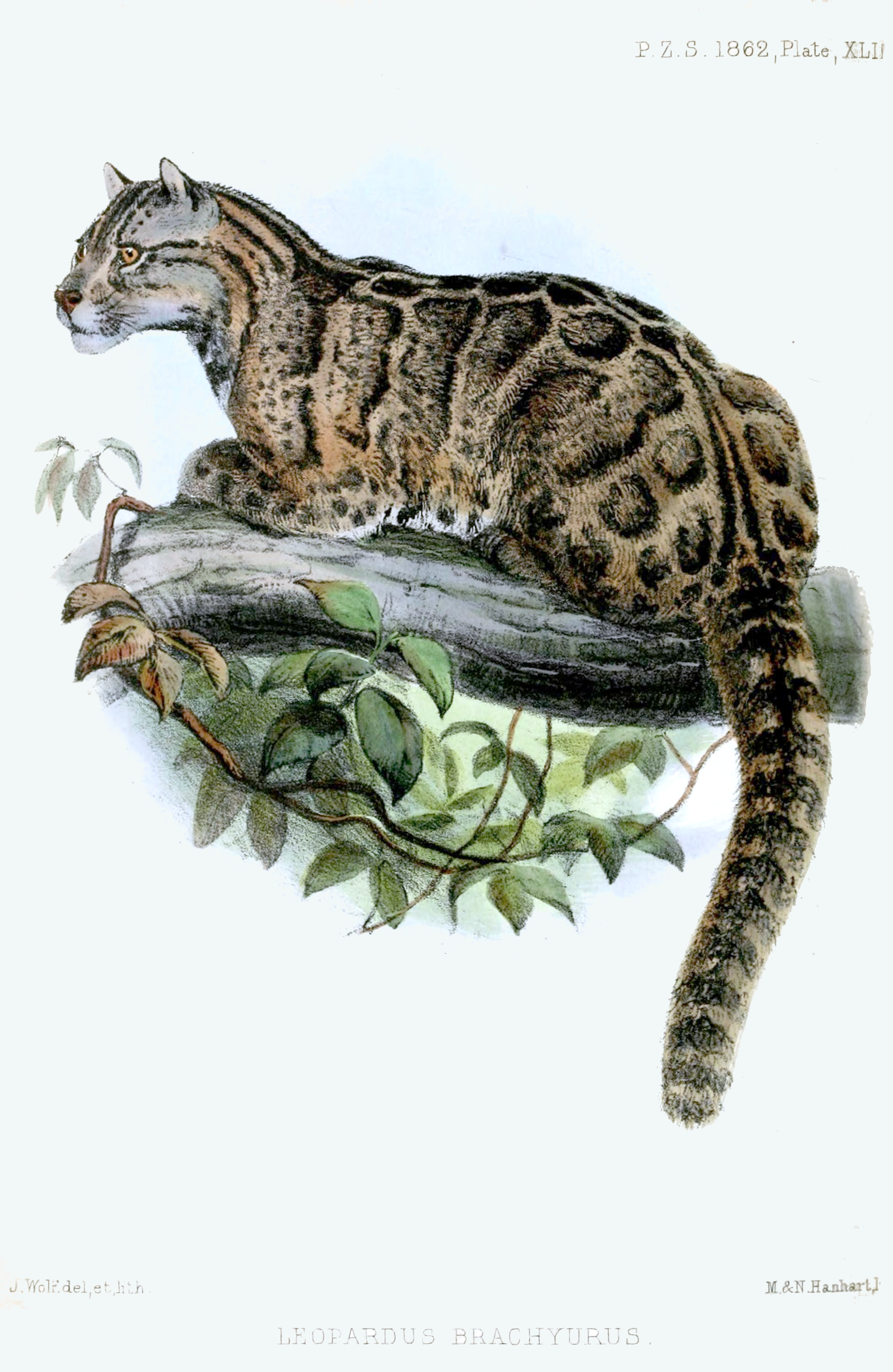
- Drawing of a Formosan clouded leopard published in 1862

Conservation status
- Extinct (IUCN 3.1)

Scientific classification
- Kingdom: Animalia
- Phylum: Chordata
- Class: Mammalia
- Order: Carnivora
- Family: Felidae
- Genus: Neofelis
- Species: N. nebulosa
- Population: †Formosan clouded leopard

Synonyms
- Neofelis nebulosa brachyurus (Swinhoe, 1862)

= Formosan clouded leopard =

Extinct population of clouded leopard

The Formosan clouded leopard was a clouded leopard (Neofelis nebulosa) population that was endemic to Taiwan. Camera trapping studies carried out in several protected areas in Taiwan between 1997 and 2012 did not record any clouded leopard. The population is listed as extinct on the IUCN Red List.

== Taxonomy ==
Felis nebulosa was the scientific name proposed by Edward Griffith in 1821 who described a skin of a clouded leopard that was brought alive from Guangdong in China to the menagerie at Exeter Exchange in London. Leopardus brachyurus was proposed by Robert Swinhoe in 1862 who described a skin of a clouded leopard from Formosa.

It was later considered the clouded leopard subspecies Neofelis nebulosa brachyurus. However, genetic analysis of hair samples of Neofelis specimens revealed that the Formosan clouded leopard is not distinct from the mainland clouded leopard. The Formosan clouded leopard is therefore currently not recognised as a distinct clouded leopard subspecies.

== Characteristics ==
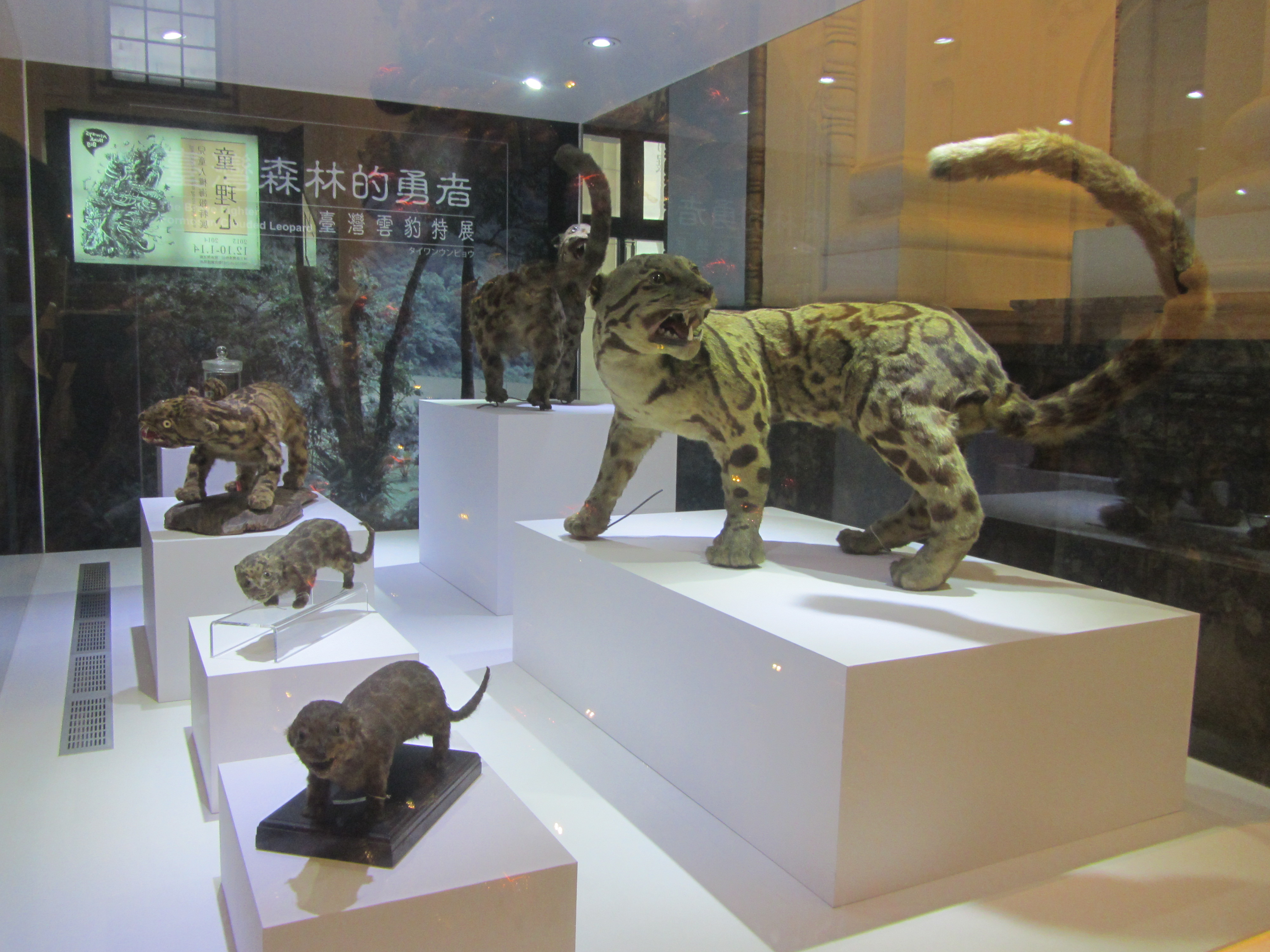
Specimen in the National Taiwan Museum

It was described in 1862 on the basis of a traded skin with an incomplete tail. Its fur colour is pale to tawny, and it has large cloud-like markings on the shoulders and flanks with a few spots within the clouds. In his first description of four Formosan clouded leopard skins, Swinhoe noted the shortness of its tail, which is about one-half the length of clouded leopard specimens from the Himalayas. Prior to its extirpation, it was Taiwan's second-largest carnivore, after the Formosan black bear (Ursus thibetanus formosanus).

== Last efforts ==
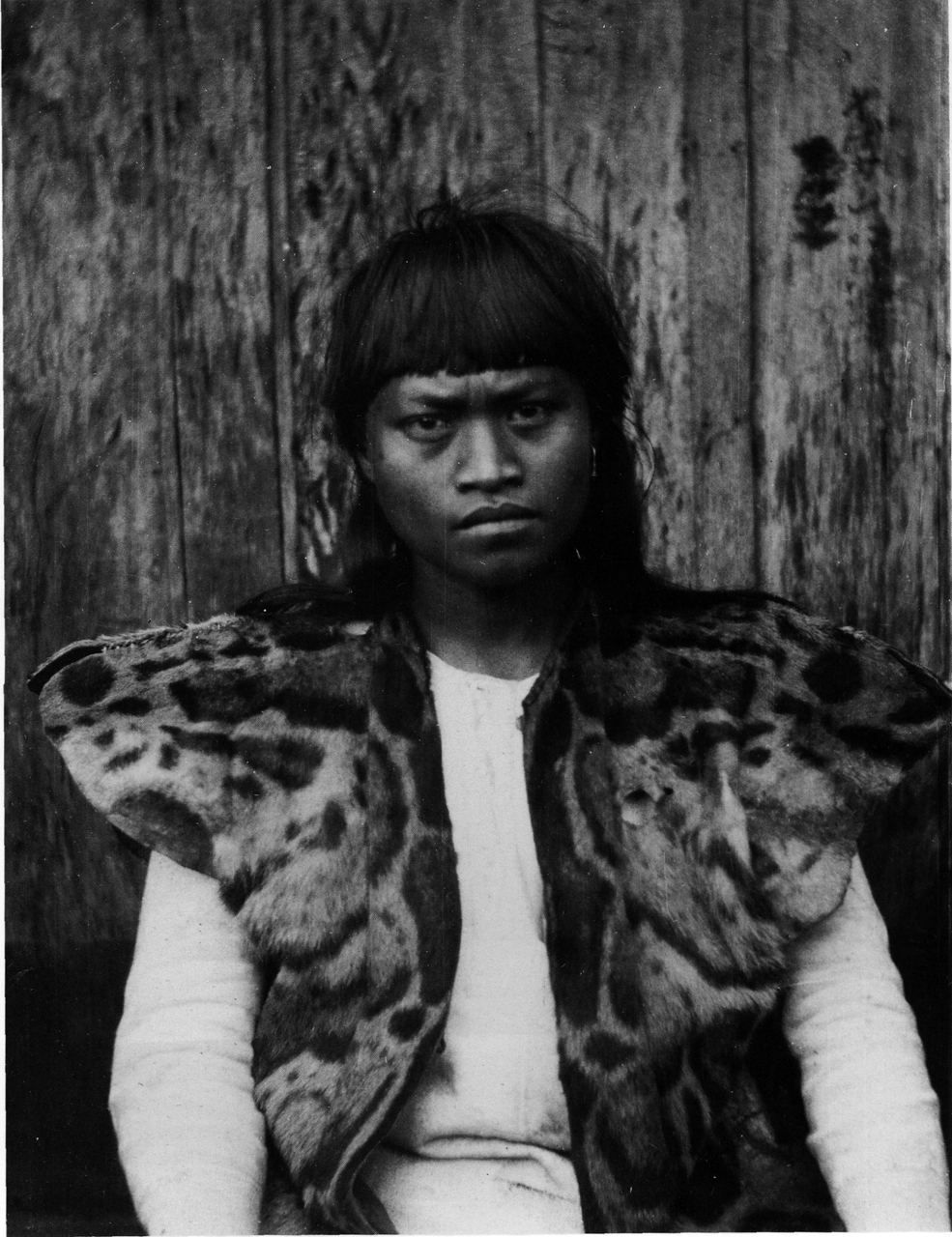
Taiwanese Indigenous person wearing a clouded leopard fur. This photograph by the Japanese anthropologist Torii Ryūzō is undated, but was most likely taken around 1900, when he was in Taiwan.

An interview survey conducted in 1986 among 70 indigenous Taiwanese hunters revealed that they sighted a Formosan clouded leopard in the Tawu Mountain area in 1983 for the last time. In 1989, the skin of a young individual was found in the Taroko National Park area, which is the last confirmed record. Pugmarks reported in the 1990s near Yushan National Park were suspected, but not confirmed to be of a clouded leopard.

It has been assumed that clouded leopards retreated into the Yushan Range and Tawu Mountain after extensive logging of natural habitat. Today, the Tawu Mountain Nature Reserve is a protected area encompassing about 480 km^{2} (190 sq mi). It harbours the largest remaining primary forest in southern Taiwan and comprises tropical and subtropical rainforest as well as temperate broadleaf and mixed forest and temperate coniferous forest.

Between 1997 and 2012, camera trapping surveys were conducted in more than 1,450 sites in potentially suitable habitats across Taiwan, from the seashore to an elevation of 3,796 m (12,454 ft), in fragmented lowlands and inside protected areas. This survey also included 13,000 camera trap nights between 2000 and 2004 in Tawu Mountain Nature Reserve and the adjacent Twin Ghost Lake Important Wildlife Area. During a nationwide survey effort of 128,349 camera trap days, 12 potential prey species were recorded, including the sambar (Rusa unicolor), the Formosan serow (Capricornis swinhoei), Reeves's muntjac (Muntiacus reevesi), the Formosan macaque (Macaca cyclopis) Swinhoe's pheasant (Lophura swinhoii) and rodents. However, not a single clouded leopard was recorded. It is therefore considered extirpated.

== Alleged sightings ==
In the summer of 2018, two different groups of rangers allegedly sighted a clouded leopard in Taitung County. One group claimed to have seen an individual climbing a tree and hunting goats on a cliff. The other group contended to have observed an individual darting past a scooter on a road and climbing into a tree.

== Cultural influence ==
The clouded leopard is highly respected by the Rukai people culture who believe that their ancestors followed a clouded leopard to their ancestral land. They consider the hunting of clouded leopards a taboo. In Paiwan culture, the pelt of clouded leopard can only be worn by the nobility.

In both cultures, it is believed that the clouded leopard and the Formosan black bear are originally white, until one day they decided to paint each other. The bear meticulously painted the leopard with exquisite patterns. The clouded leopard painted the bear all black, except for the V-shaped area before the chest, which remained white for various reasons depending on the version of the story. As an apology for the bad work, now the clouded leopards only eat a part of their prey, leaving the rest for the bear.

The Taoyuan Leopards professional basketball team's name is inspired by the species.

== See also ==
- List of protected species in Taiwan
- List of endemic species of Taiwan
