= Baleng Tower =

Tower in Fuxing, Taoyuan City, Taiwan

- 巴陵鐵塔
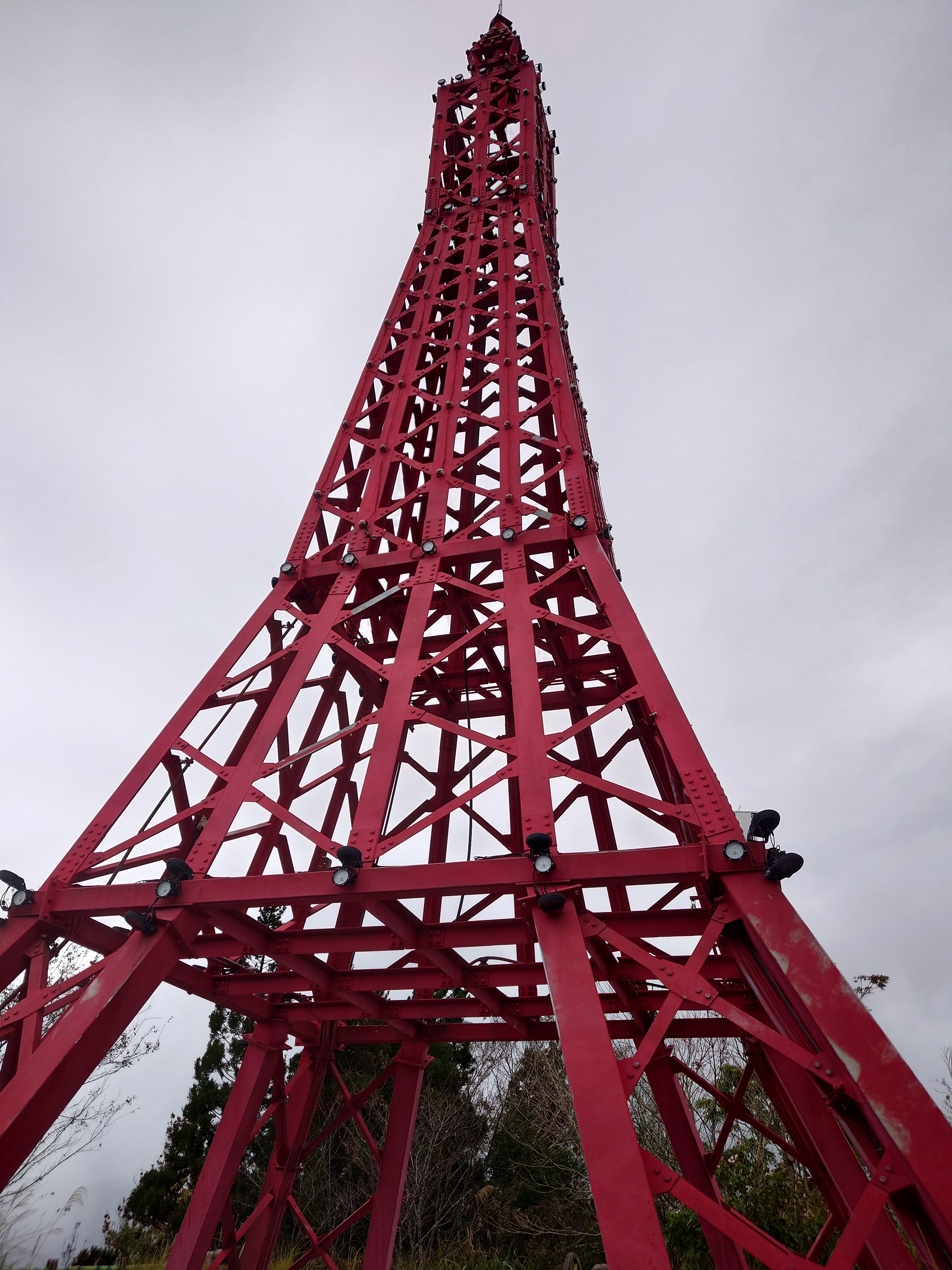
- Interactive map of the Baleng Tower area

General information
- Type: tower
- Location: Fuxing, Taoyuan City, Taiwan
- Coordinates: 24°41′04.5″N 121°23′42.9″E
- Elevation: 1,314 m (4,311 ft)
- Cost: NT$13 million

Height
- Height: 29.5 m (97 ft)

Technical details
- Floor count: 10

The Baleng Tower (traditional Chinese: 巴陵鐵塔; simplified Chinese: 巴陵铁塔; pinyin: Bālíng Tiětǎ) is a tower in Fuxing District, Taoyuan City, Taiwan.

== Architecture ==
The 29.5 meters high tower was constructed in a former fort built during the Japanese rule of Taiwan. It was constructed on an altitude of 1,314 meters above sea level. The structure is equipped with LED lamps that will shine during night time. It was constructed with the Atayal culture and Eiffel Tower architectural style.

== See also ==
- List of tourist attractions in Taiwan
