= Formosa maritima =

Scientific classification
- Domain: Bacteria
- Kingdom: Pseudomonadati
- Phylum: Bacteroidota
- Class: Flavobacteriia
- Order: Flavobacteriales
- Family: Flavobacteriaceae
- Genus: Formosa
- Species: F. maritima

Binomial name
- Formosa maritima Cao et al. 2020

Type strain
- 1494

Bacterium

Formosa maritima is a Gram-negative, strictly aerobic, rod-shaped and motile bacterium from the genus Formosa which has been isolated from sediments from the coast of Weihai in China. Cells are oxidase and catalase positive. Optimum growth occurs at 30 °C and pH of 7.0.
