= Formoso River =

There are several rivers named Formoso River in Brazil:

- Formoso River (Bahia)
- Formoso River (Goiás)
- Formoso River (Paraná)
- Formoso River (Rondônia)
- Formoso River (Tocantins)

== See also ==
- Formoso (disambiguation)
- Rio Formoso, Pernambuco, Brazil
