= Formosa haliotis =

Scientific classification
- Domain: Bacteria
- Kingdom: Pseudomonadati
- Phylum: Bacteroidota
- Class: Flavobacteriia
- Order: Flavobacteriales
- Family: Flavobacteriaceae
- Genus: Formosa
- Species: F. haliotis

Binomial name
- Formosa haliotis Tanaka et al. 2015

Synonyms
- Formosa algicola

Bacterium

Formosa haliotis is a Gram-negative, aerobic, rod-shaped bacterium from the genus Formosa which has been isolated from the marine snail Haliotis gigantea in Japan.
