= Fuxing District, Taoyuan =

Mountain indigenous district in Taoyuan City, Taiwan

Fuxing 復興區 Fusing
- Mountain Indigenous District
- Fuxing District
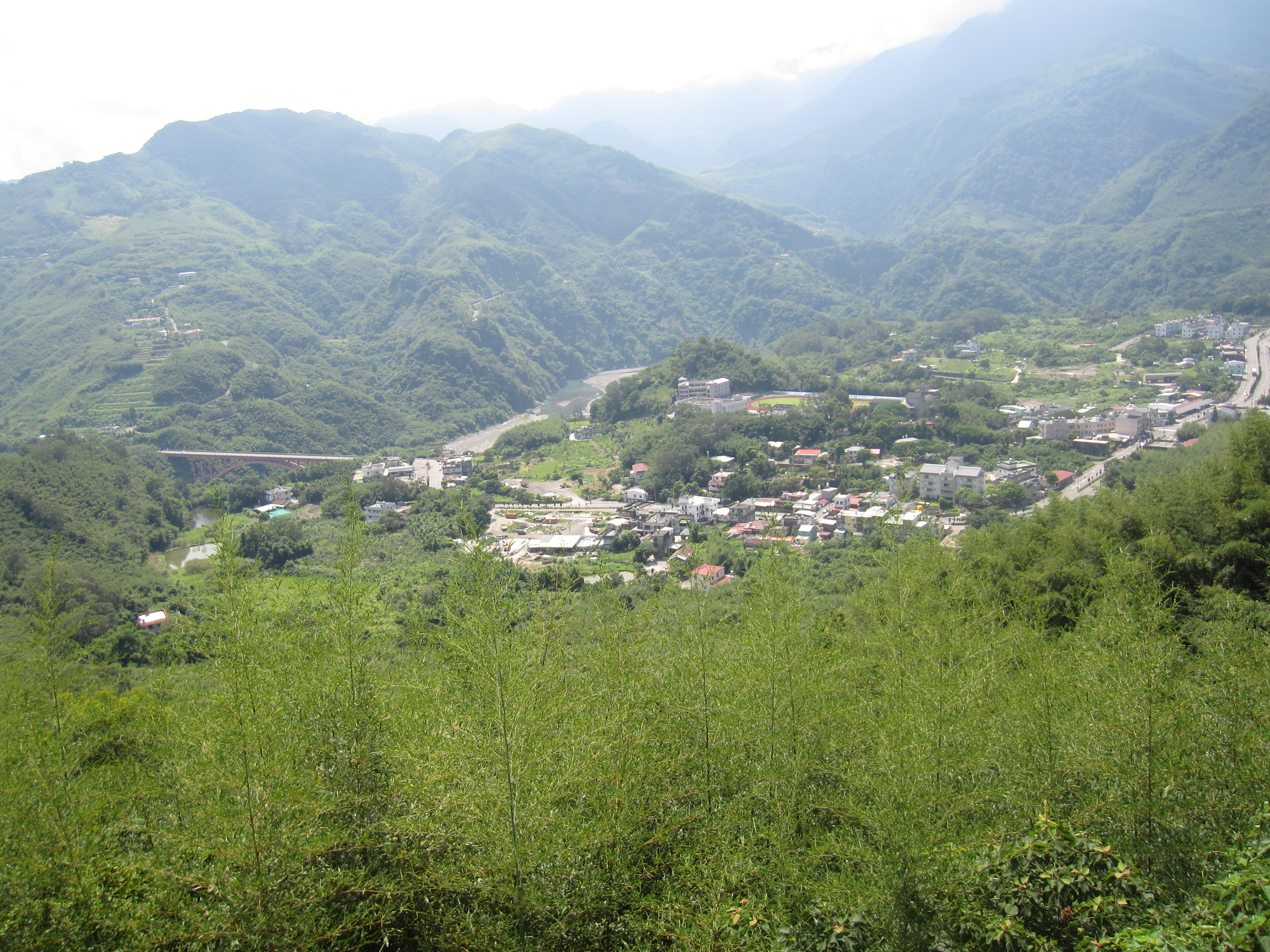

- Fuxing District in Taoyuan City
- Coordinates: 24°42′54″N 121°21′18″E
- Country: Taiwan
- Municipality: Taoyuan City
- Boroughs: List: 10 villages

Government
  - Type: District government
  - District chief: Fan Cheng-hsin (Ind.)

Area
  - Total: 350.78 km^{2} (135.44 sq mi)

Population (March 2023)
  - Total: 13,089
- Website: www.fuxing.tycg.gov.tw (in Chinese)

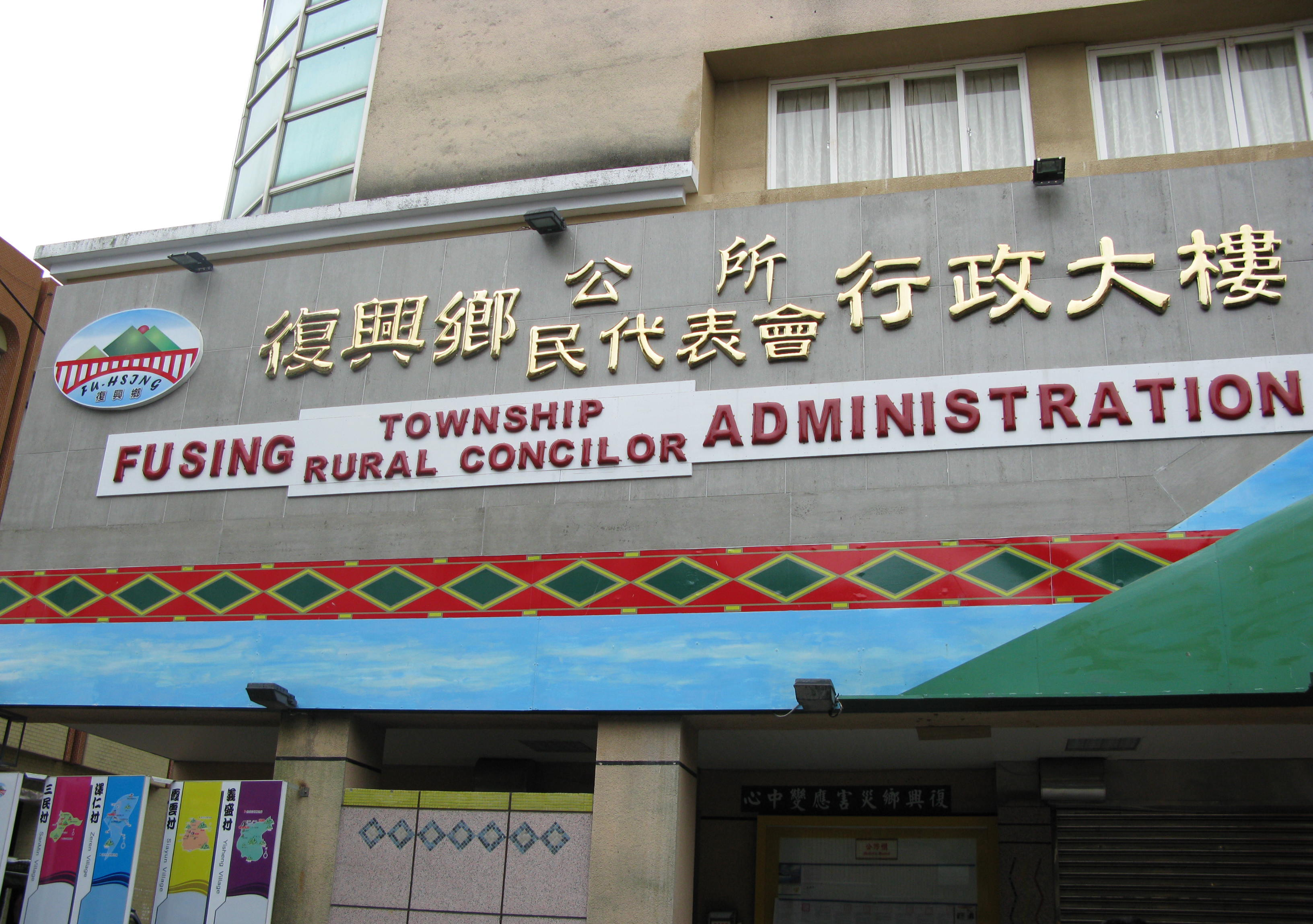
Fuxing District office (then Fuxing Township office)

Fuxing District (Atayal: Pyasan; Chinese: 復興區; pinyin: Fùxīng Qū), formerly known as Fuxing Township or Fu-Hsing Township (Chinese: 復興鄉; Hanyu Pinyin: Fùxīng Xiāng; Tongyong Pinyin: Fùsing Siang; Wade–Giles: Fu^{4}-hsing^{1} Hsiang^{1}) is a mountain indigenous district in eastern Taoyuan City, Taiwan. The main population is the Atayal people of the Taiwanese aborigines. Lala Mountain (拉拉山) is a major feature of Fuxing, and the Shimen Reservoir, formed by Shimen Dam, is a popular nearby site. Fuxing District is, by area, the largest district in Taoyuan City.

== History ==
Under Japanese rule, Fuxing District was classified as Aboriginal Land (蕃地).

In August 2015, the Heliu community in the district were completely buried by landslide triggered by Typhoon Soudelor.

== Geography ==
- Area: 350.78 km^{2} (135.4 sq mi)
- Population: 13,089 people (March 2023)

== Administrative divisions ==
Gaoyi, Hualing, Kuihui, Luofu, Sanguang, Sanmin, Xiayun, Yicheng, Zeren and Zhangxing Village.

== Mountains over 1500 metres ==
- Najieshan 那結山, 1,520 m (4,987 ft)
- Mawangzenglüshan 馬望曾呂山, 1,577 m (5,174 ft)
- Niaozuishan 鳥嘴山, 1,749 m (5,738 ft)
- Xingjianshan 興尖山, 1,852 m (6,076 ft)
- Fufushan 夫婦山, 1,870 m (6,135 ft)
- Meiguiximoshan 玫瑰西魔山, 1,871 m (6,138 ft)
- Lengshan 稜山, 1,889 m (6,198 ft)
- Lupeishan 魯培山, 1,905 m (6,250 ft)
- Nanchatianshan 南插天山, 1,907 m (6,257 ft)
- Lidongshan 李棟山, 1,914 m (6,280 ft)
- Lalashan 拉拉山, 2,030 m (6,660 ft)
- Tangsuishan 唐穗山, 2,090 m (6,280 ft)
- Babokulushan 巴博庫魯山, 2,101 m (6,893 ft)
- Tamanshan 塔曼山, 2,130 m (6,988 ft)
- Dilushan 低陸山, 2,160 m (7,087 ft)
- Yufengshan 玉峰山, 2,300 m (7,546 ft)
- Xiqiusishan 西丘斯山, 2,427 m (7,963 ft)
- Baideshan 白的山, 2,444 m (8,018 ft)

== Northern Cross-Island Highway Hiking Trails ==
- 12.1 km (7.5 mi) > Sanmin Bat Cave...
- 16.3 km (10.1 mi) > Jiaobanshan, Jinpingshan...
- 17.7 km (11 mi) > Dongyanshan, Zhijishan...
- 20.7 km (12.9 mi) > Xiao Wulai > Hewei Ancient Trees, Beichatianshan, Nanchatianshan, Lupaishan, Daishifushan...
- 22.7 km (14.1 mi) > Luofu > Roma Rd.
- 28.2 km (17.5 mi) > Dawan > Najieshan...
- 31.1 km (19.3 mi) > Xuewu Tunnel > Fufushan...
- 39.9 km (24.8 mi) > Gaoyi > Yingshan...
- 46.5 km (28.9 mi) > Baling Bridge.
- 47.4 km (29.5 mi) > Galahe > Xuebaishan, Tangsuishan, Dilushan, Yufengshan, Siqiusishan...
- 47.8 km (29.7 mi) > Shang Baling > Lalashan Ancient Trees, Tamanshan, Meiguiximoshan, Baling-Fushan Trail...
- 59.3 km (36.8 mi)> Jianshan...
- 61.5 km (38.2 mi) > Lengshan
- 67.0 km (41.6 mi) > Mingchi > Babokulushan...

== River Tracing ==
- Yunei River
- Xibuqiao River
- Sanguang River
- Taman River

== Tourist attractions ==
- Baleng Tower
- Chatianshan Nature Reserve
- Dongyanshan Forest Recreation Area
- Jiaobanshan Sculpture Park
- Jiguopai Old Church
- Junghua Dam
- Lalashan Forest Reserve
- Luofu Bridge
- Sanmin Bat Cave
- Xiao Wulai Waterfall
- Xikou Suspension Bridge

== Transportation ==
Zhongli Bus Co.

- Taoyuan Station 桃園 06:30 – Linbankou 林班口開 09:30
- Taoyuan Station 桃園 12:30 - Linbankou 林班口開 15:30

Taoyuan Bus Co.

- Taoyuan Station 桃園 06:50 - Linbankou 林班口開 09:50
- Zhongli Station 中壢 10:30 - Linbankou 林班口開 13:30
