= Xikou Suspension Bridge =

Bridge in Fuxing, Taoyuan City, Taiwan

Xikou Suspension Bridge 溪口吊橋
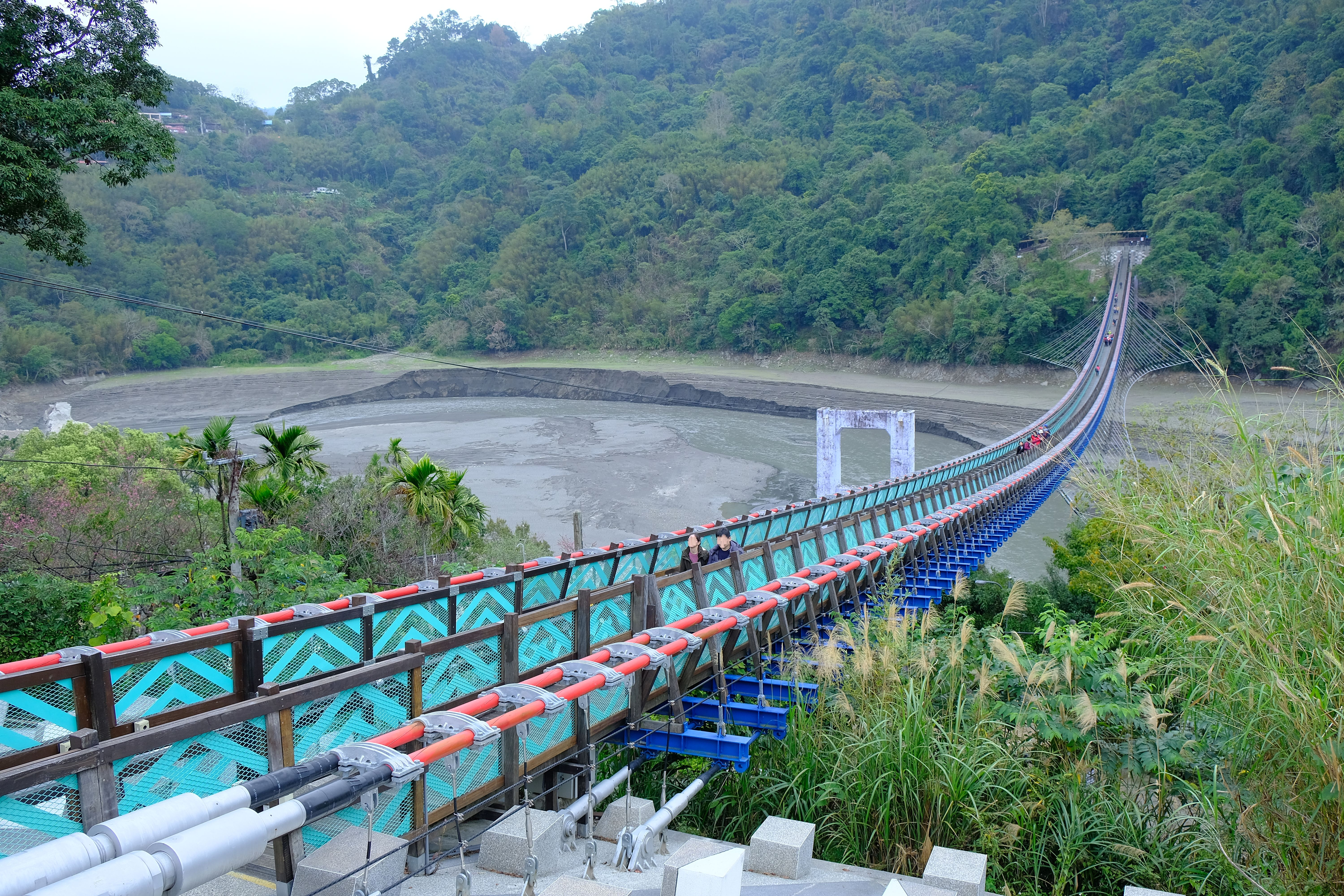
- Coordinates: 24°48′35.2″N 121°20′51.8″E
- Crosses: Dahan River
- Locale: Fuxing, Taoyuan City, Taiwan

Characteristics
- Design: suspension bridge
- Total length: 330 meters

History
- Inaugurated: January 2018

Location
- Interactive map of Xikou Suspension Bridge

The Xikou Suspension Bridge (traditional Chinese: 溪口吊橋; simplified Chinese: 溪口吊桥; pinyin: Xīkǒu Diàoqiáo) is a suspension bridge in Fuxing District, Taoyuan City, Taiwan. It crosses the Dahan River.

== History ==
The bridge was inaugurated in January 2018 to replace the old bridge constructed at the same site.

== Technical specifications ==
The bridge spans over a length of 330 meters.

== See also ==
- List of bridges in Taiwan
