= Formoso (disambiguation) =

Formoso is a municipality in the state of Goiás, Brazil.

Formoso may also refer to

- Formoso, Minas Gerais, a municipality in Brazil
- Formoso, Kansas, a village in the United States
- Porto Formoso, a parish in the municipality of Ribeira Grande in the north of the island of São Miguel in the Azores Islands
- Porto Formoso, Cape Verde, a village in the east of the island of Santiago in Cape Verde

== See also ==
- Formoso River (disambiguation)
- Formosa (disambiguation)
