= Formosa agariphila =

Scientific classification
- Domain: Bacteria
- Kingdom: Pseudomonadati
- Phylum: Bacteroidota
- Class: Flavobacteriia
- Order: Flavobacteriales
- Family: Flavobacteriaceae
- Genus: Formosa
- Species: F. agariphila

Binomial name
- Formosa agariphila Nedashkovskaya et al. 2006

Bacterium

Formosa agariphila is a Gram-negative, heterotrophic and aerobic bacterium from the genus Formosa which occur in marine environments.
