= Formosa undariae =

Scientific classification
- Domain: Bacteria
- Kingdom: Pseudomonadati
- Phylum: Bacteroidota
- Class: Flavobacteriia
- Order: Flavobacteriales
- Family: Flavobacteriaceae
- Genus: Formosa
- Species: F. undariae

Binomial name
- Formosa undariae Park et al. 2013

Type strain
- WS-MY3

Bacterium

Formosa undariae is a Gram-negative, aerobic and rod-shaped bacterium from the genus Formosa. It has been isolated from a brown algae reservoir in South Korea.
