= Formosa algae =

Scientific classification
- Domain: Bacteria
- Kingdom: Pseudomonadati
- Phylum: Bacteroidota
- Class: Flavobacteriia
- Order: Flavobacteriales
- Family: Flavobacteriaceae
- Genus: Formosa
- Species: F. algae

Binomial name
- Formosa algae Ivanova et al. 2004

Bacterium

Formosa algae is a Gram-negative, short-rod-shaped and non-motile bacterium from the genus Formosa. The species exhibits gliding motility. Cells are oxidase negative and catalase positive.
