= Luofu Bridge =

Bridge in Fuxing, Taoyuan City, Taiwan

Luofu Bridge 羅浮橋
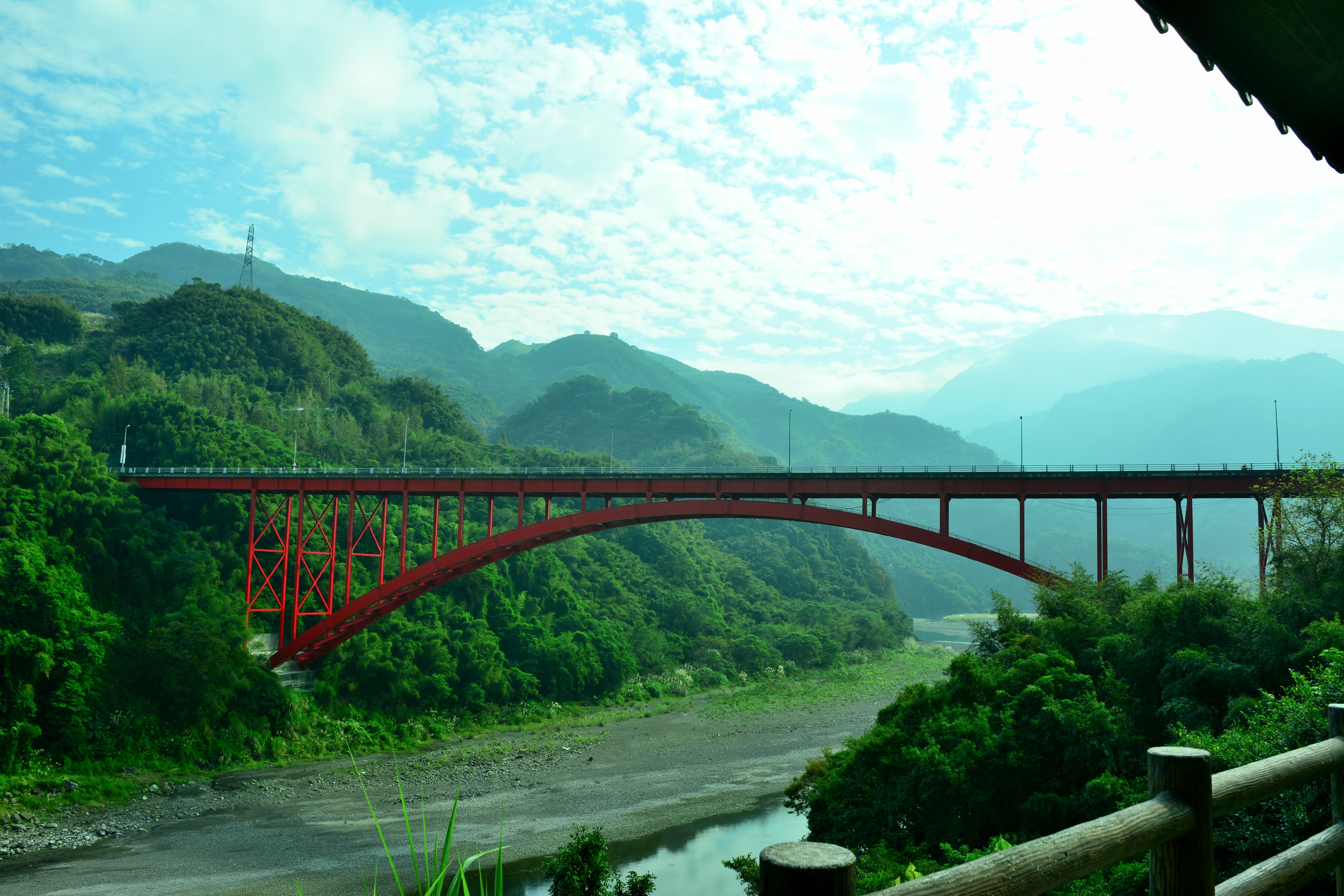
- Coordinates: 24°48′00″N 121°22′00″E
- Locale: Fuxing, Taoyuan City, Taiwan

Characteristics
- Design: arch bridge
- Material: Iron
- Total length: 230 meters

Location
- Interactive map of Luofu Bridge

The Luofu Bridge (traditional Chinese: 羅浮橋; simplified Chinese: 罗浮桥; pinyin: Dàxī Qiáo) is a bridge in Fuxing District, Taoyuan City, Taiwan.

== Architecture ==
The bridge was built over the Dahan River along Provincial Highway 7. The iron arch bridge is 230 meters (750 ft) long.

== See also ==
- List of bridges in Taiwan
