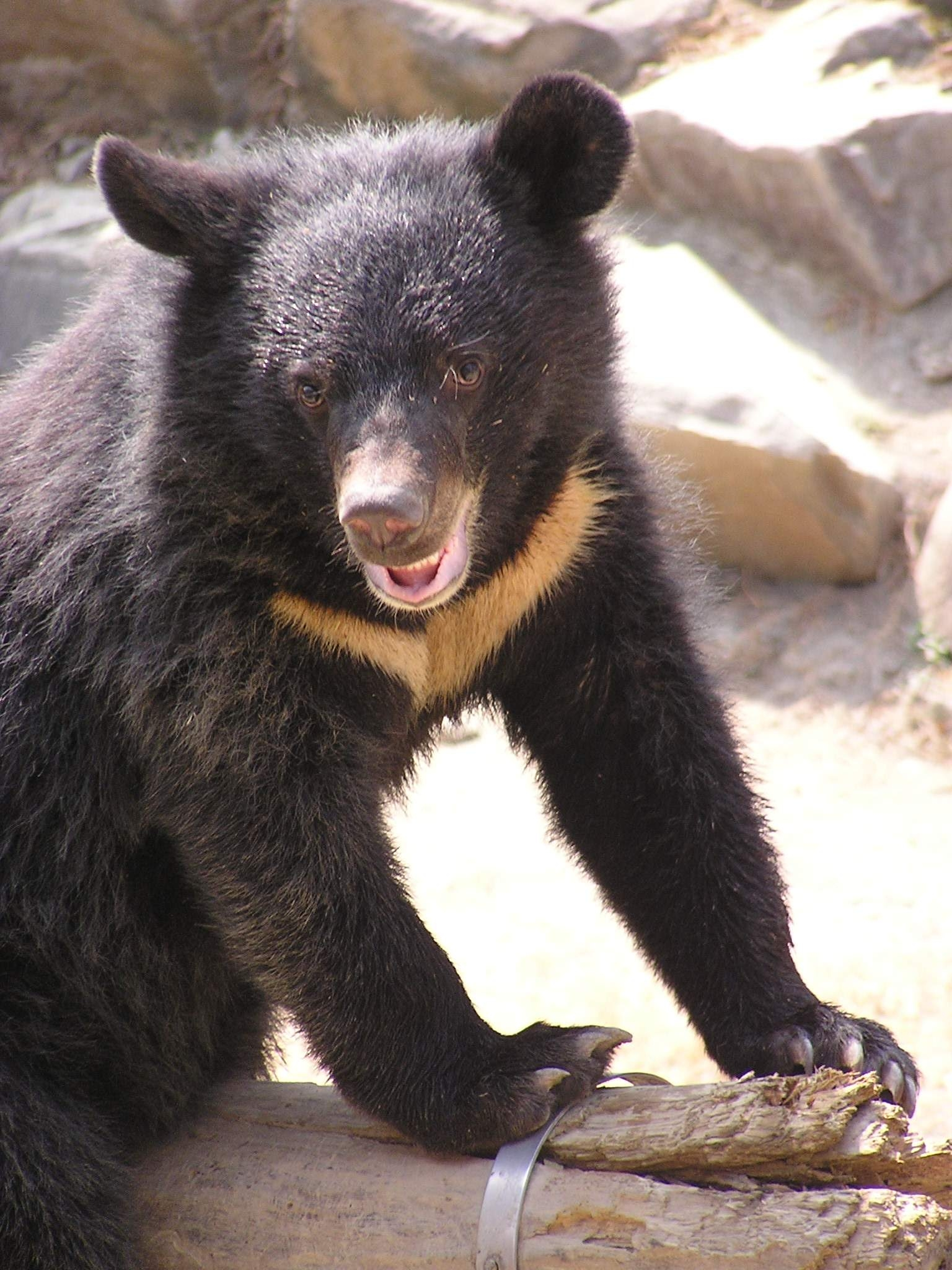

Conservation status
- Vulnerable (IUCN 3.1)
- CITES Appendix I

Scientific classification
- Kingdom: Animalia
- Phylum: Chordata
- Class: Mammalia
- Order: Carnivora
- Family: Ursidae
- Genus: Ursus
- Species: U. thibetanus
- Subspecies: U. t. formosanus

Trinomial name
- Ursus thibetanus formosanus R. Swinhoe, 1864

Synonyms
- Selenarctos thibetanus formosanus

= Formosan black bear =

Subspecies of carnivore

The Formosan black bear (Chinese: 臺灣黑熊, Ursus thibetanus formosanus), also known as the Taiwanese black bear or white-throated bear, is a subspecies of the Asiatic black bear. It was first described by Robert Swinhoe in 1864. Formosan black bears are endemic to Taiwan. They are also the largest land animals and the only native bears (Ursidae) in Taiwan. They are seen to represent the Taiwanese nation.

Because of severe exploitation and habitat degradation in recent decades, populations of wild Formosan black bears have been declining. This species was listed as "endangered" under Taiwan's Wildlife Conservation Act (野生動物保育法) in 1989. Their geographic distribution is restricted to remote, rugged areas at elevations of 1,000–3,500 m (3,300–11,500 ft). The estimated number of individuals is 200 to 600.

== Physical characteristics ==
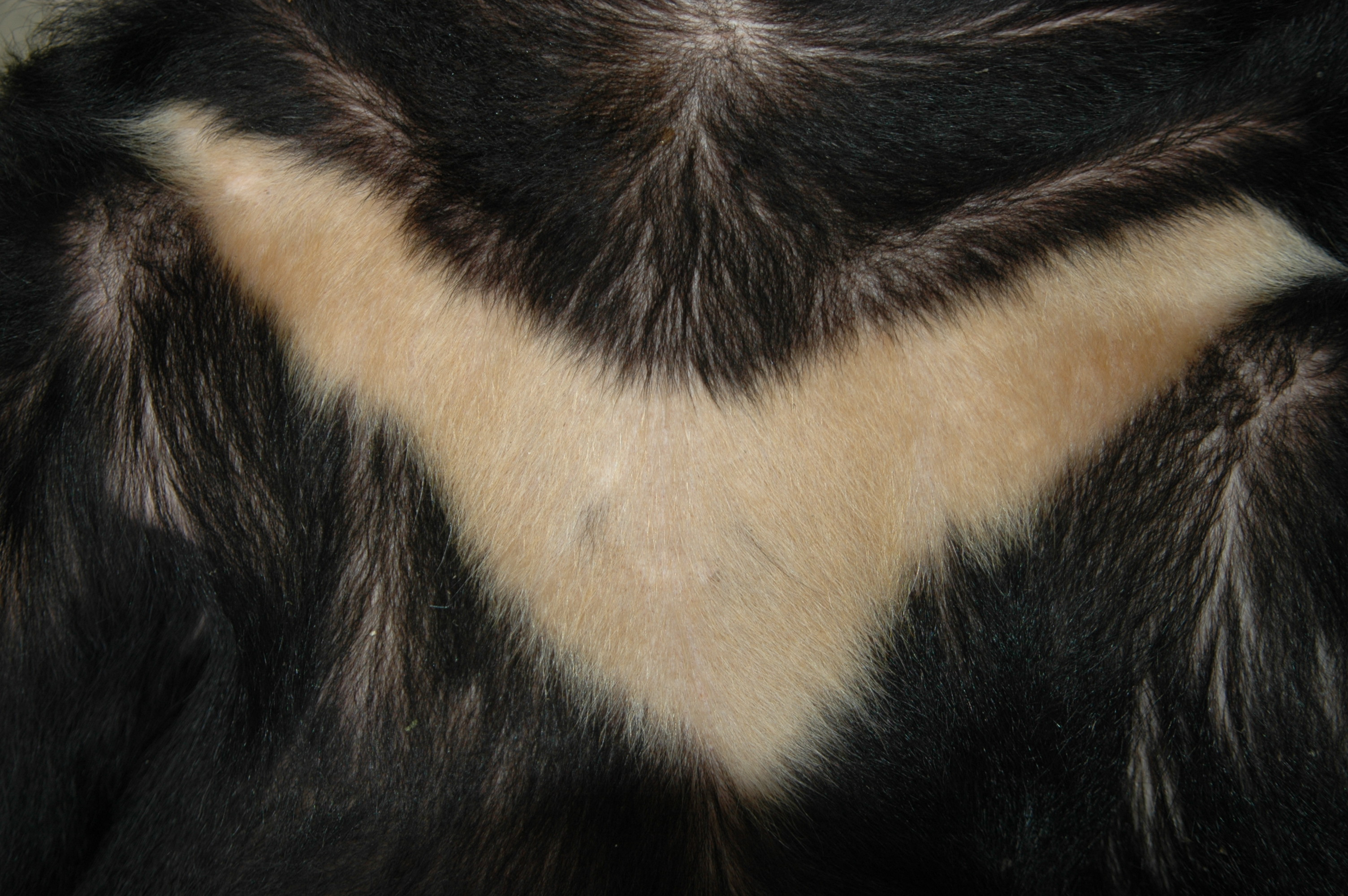
The V-shaped white mark on a bear's chest

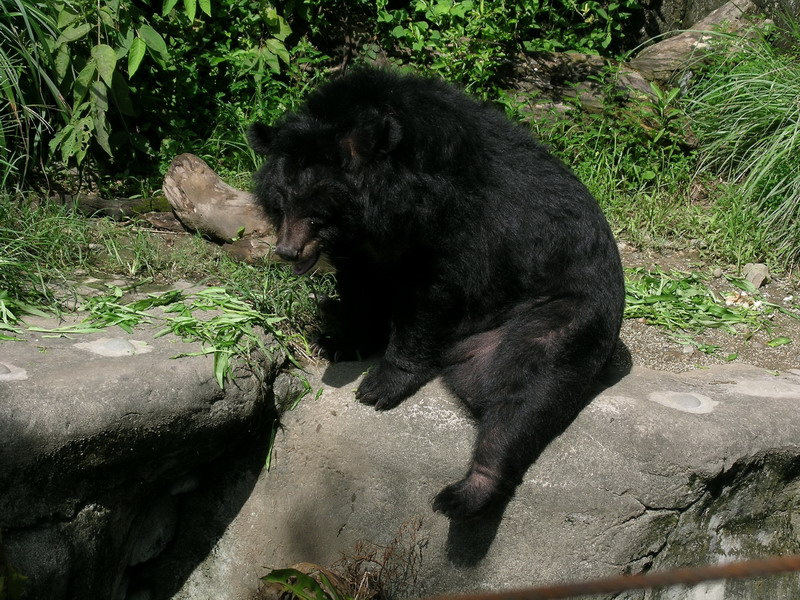
A Formosan black bear

The Formosan black bear is sturdily built and has a round head, short neck, small eyes, and long snout. Its head measures 26–35 cm (10–14 in) in length and 40–60 cm (16–24 in) in circumference. Its ears are 8–12 cm (3.1–4.7 in) long. Its snout resembles a dog's, hence its nickname is "dog bear". Its tail is inconspicuous and short—usually less than 10 cm (3.9 in) long. Its body is well covered with rough, glossy, black hair, which can grow over 10 cm long around the neck. The tip of its chin is white. On the chest, there is a distinctive yellowish or white mark that is shaped like a "V" character or a crescent moon. This earns it another nickname—"lunar bear". It weighs from 50 to 200 kg (110 to 440 lb).

== Diet ==
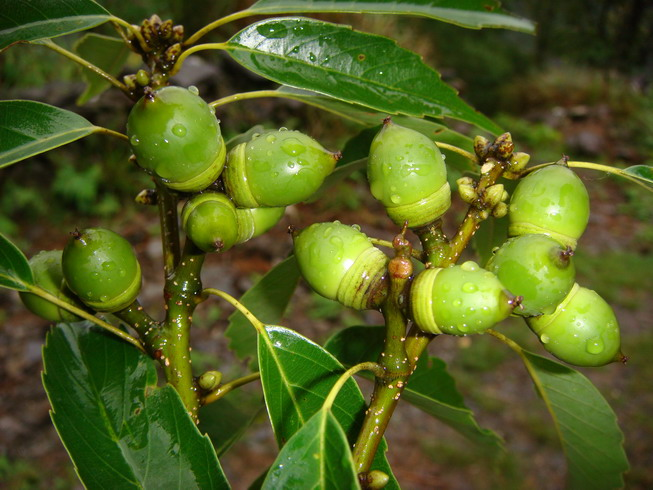
Acorns

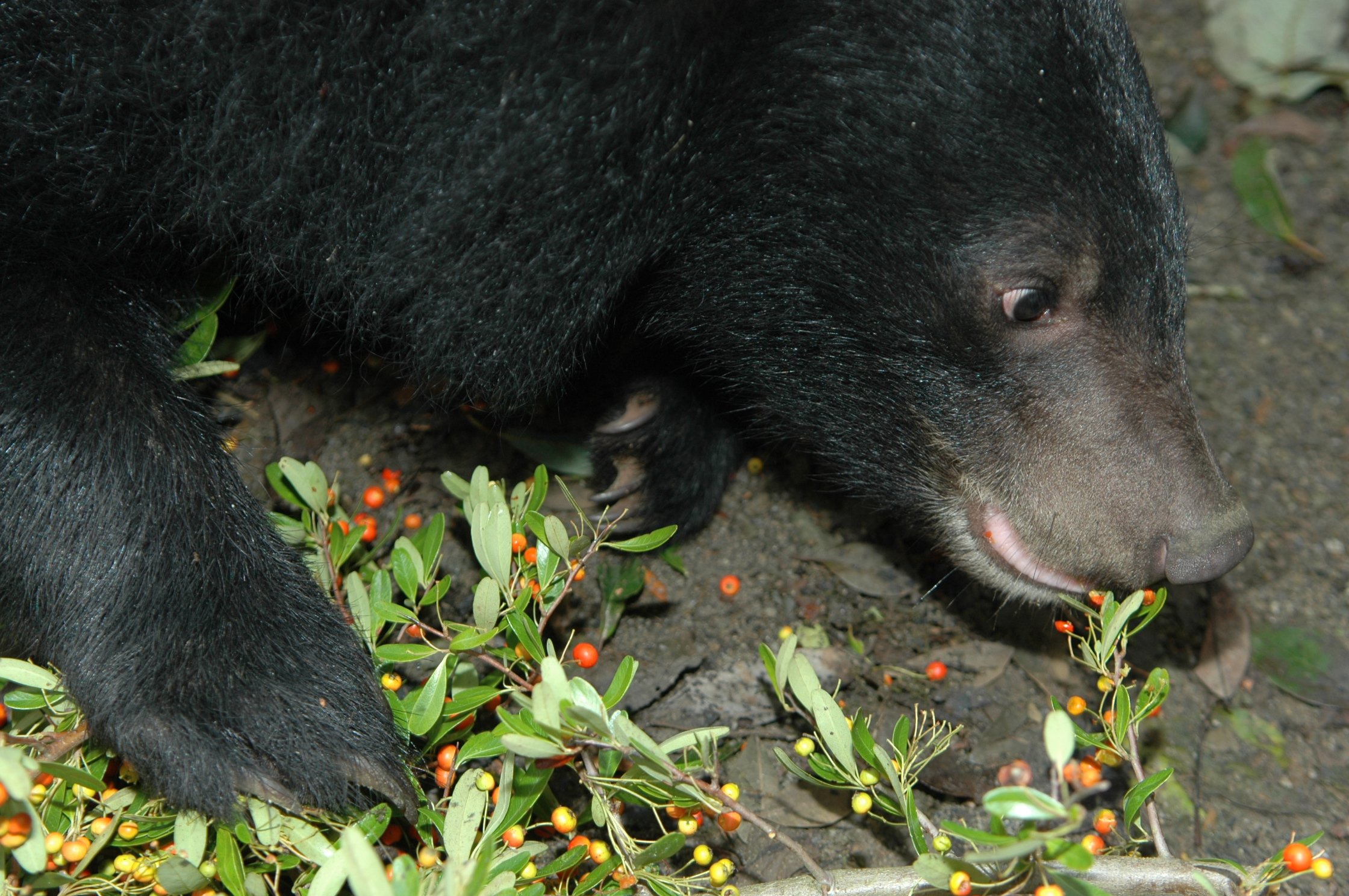
A bear eating fruits

They feed primarily on leaves, buds, fruits, roots, although they also eat insects, small animals, and carrion. Diets of bears monitored in Yushan National Park include succulent vegetation in spring, soft fruits rich in carbohydrate in summer, and fat-loaded hard mast (e.g., acorn and walnut) in fall/winter.

== Distribution ==
Believed to be once widespread across Taiwan (Formosa), it is now mostly confined to the mountain ranges. It can be found along the Central and Snow mountain ranges. The largest population of bears seem to be located in Lala Mountain in Chatienshan Reserve, the (Snow) Mountain area in Sheipa National Park, and Taroko National Park south to Tawushan Reserve through Yushan National Park.

== Habitat and behavior ==
The Formosan bear lives in the mountainous forests in the eastern two-thirds of Taiwan at elevations of 1,000 to 3,000 m (3,300 to 9,800 ft). In the winter, rather than hibernating like Asiatic black bears in temperate areas, they move to lower elevations to find food. They are active for 54–57% of daylight hours, and more active during summer (60%) and fall/winter (60%) than spring (47%). They are primarily active during the day in the spring and summer; and increasingly active at night in the fall/winter when acorns are abundant. They are solitary and usually move around extensively except during the mating season or when caring for cubs. Formosan bears are also the only bears on the planet that make temporary nests.

Formosan black bears can easily outrun humans, reaching speeds of 30–40 km (19–25 mi) per hour. They are skilled at swimming and climbing, as well. Because of their endangered species status and their habit of avoiding humans, Formosan black bears are rarely seen in the wild. In most encounters the bear retreats and runs away from humans. Even though bears can be aggressive, they only harm things that harm them, and rarely attack humans without provocation.

== Reproduction ==
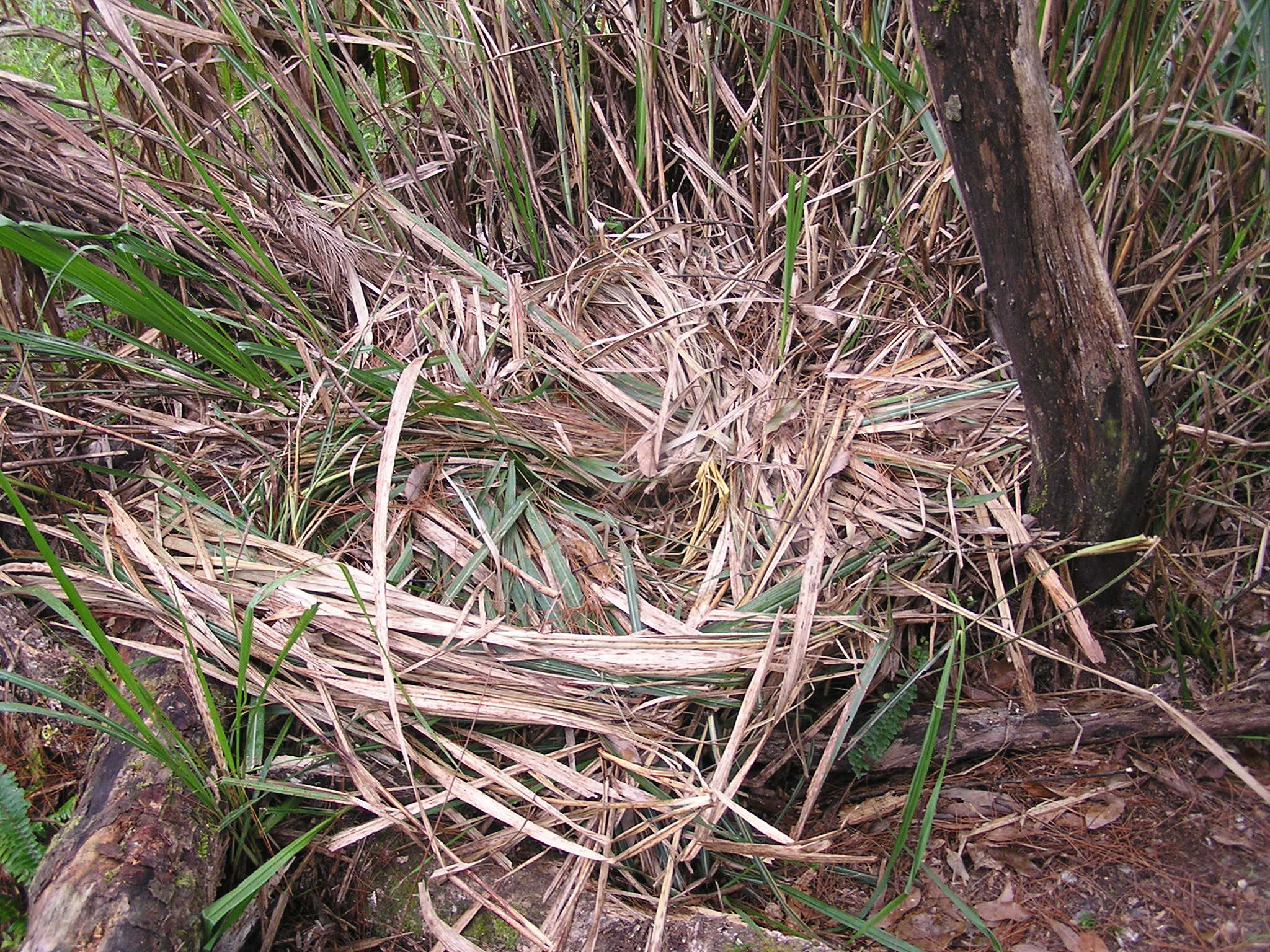
A bowl-shaped ground nest made by a bear

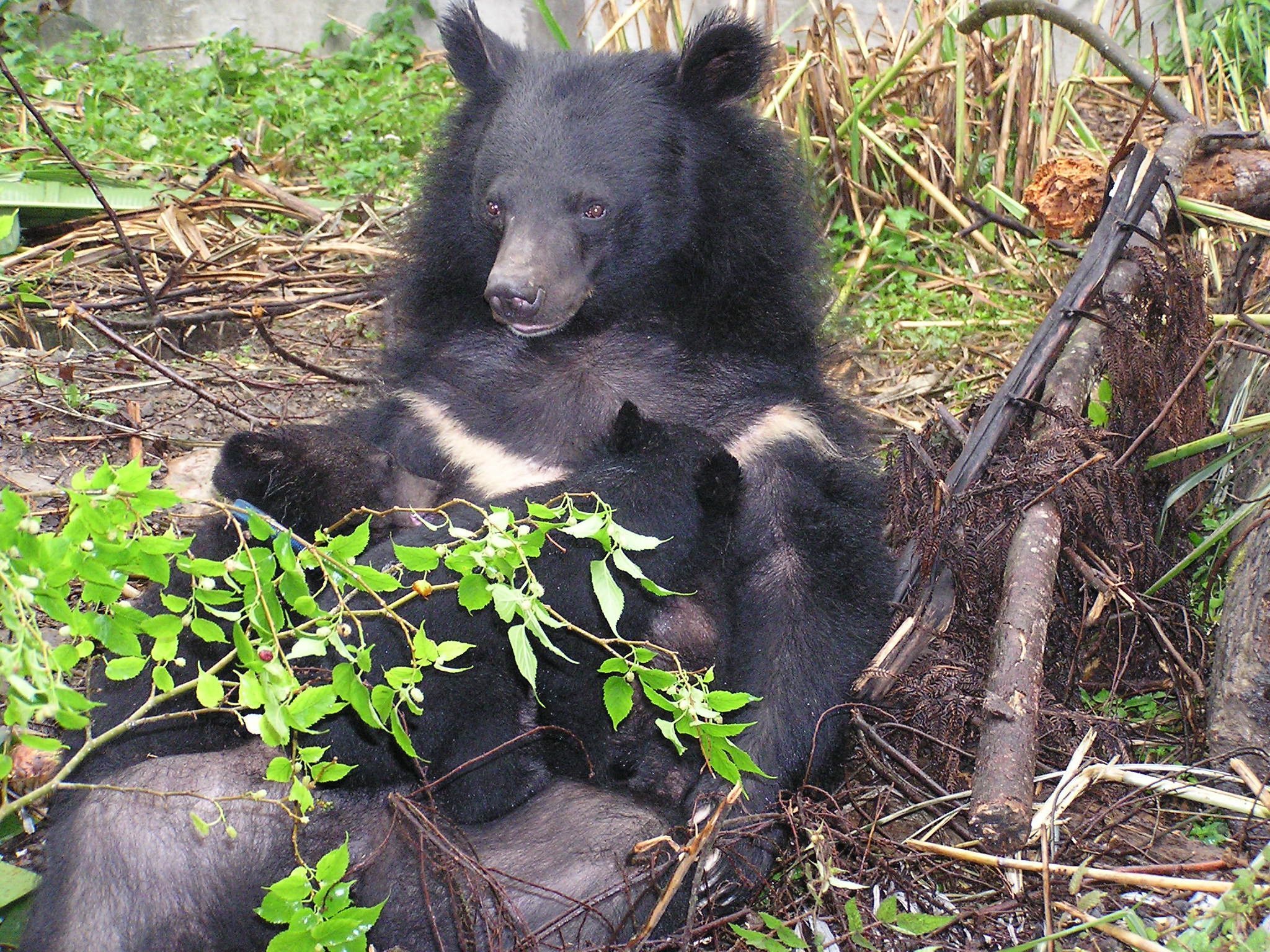
A mother bear nursing her cubs

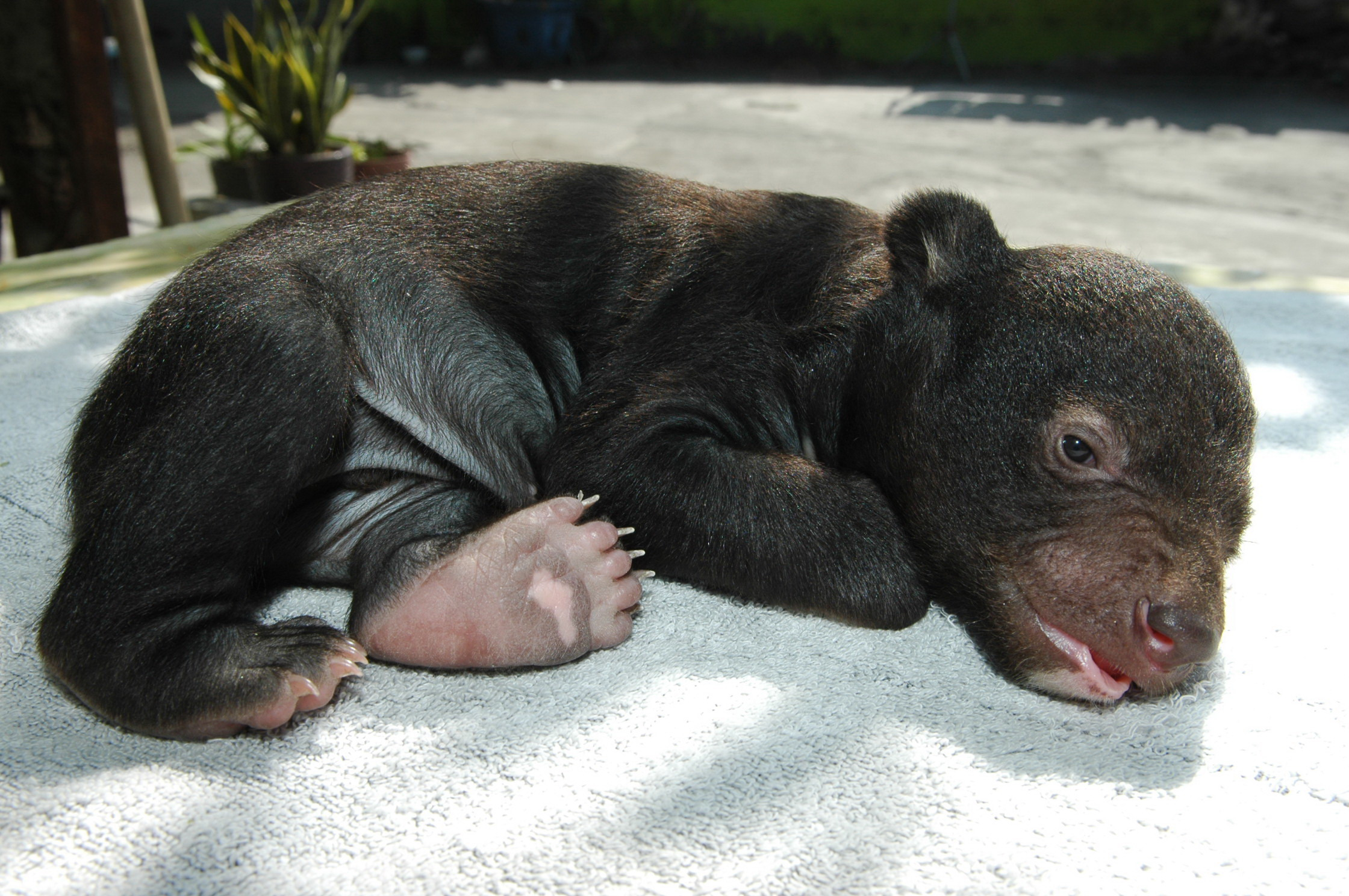
A 44-day-old cub

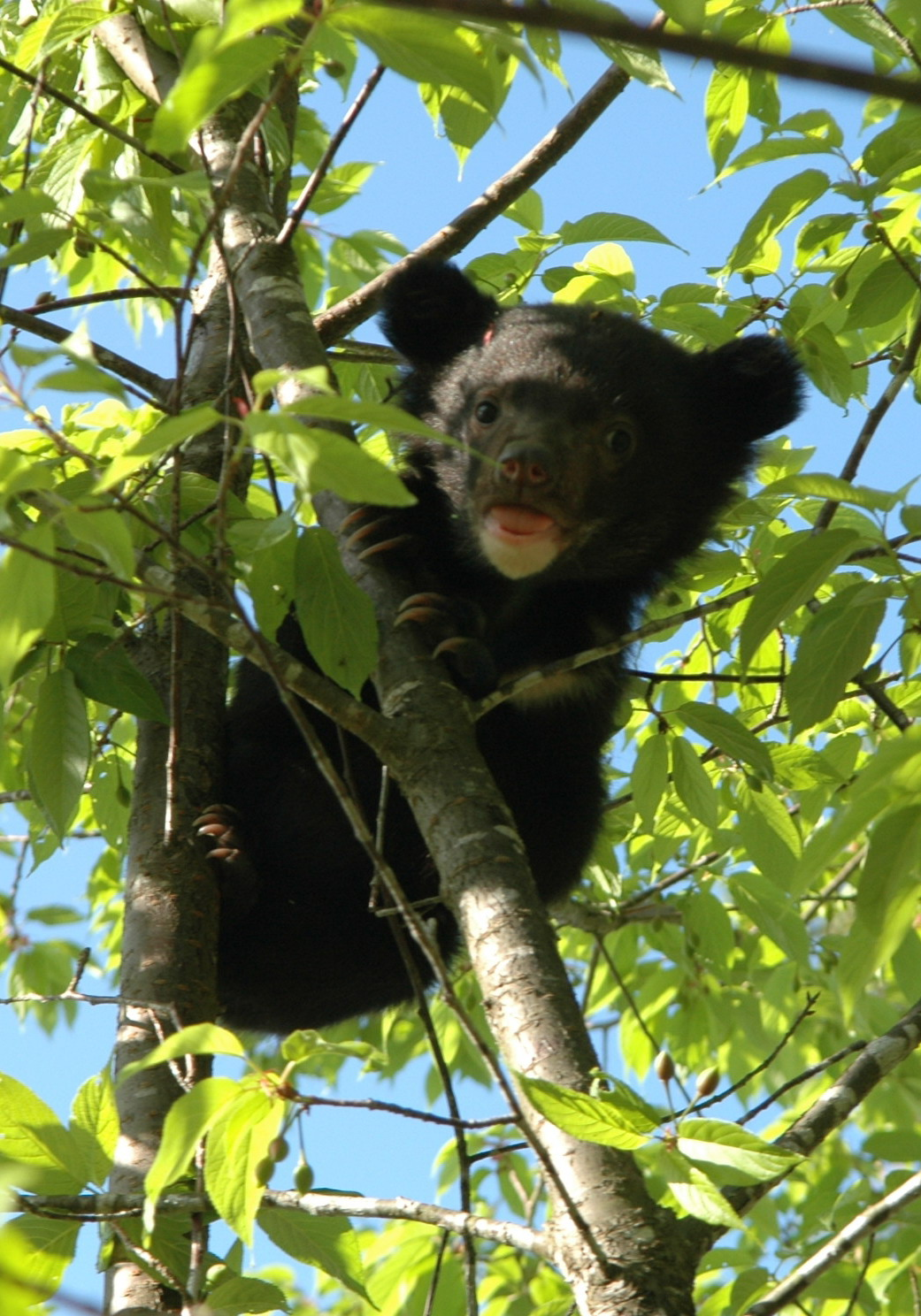
A bear cub climbing in a tree

As solitary animals, Formosan black bears do not stay in fixed shelters, except for females during their breeding period. The bear's courtship period is very brief. A male trails after a female for a few days. After mating, they return to their solitary lives. Females reach sexual maturity at age 3–4 and males reach sexual maturity at age 4–5, usually one year later than females. Mating is usually from June to August and pregnancy lasts for 6–7 months. Thus, wild females usually give birth between December and the following February.

Each birth produces 1–3 cubs. Cubs will be nursed by mother for about six months. When they are strong enough to leave the den, bear cubs will remain with the mother for approximately two years, until the mother enters the next cycle of estrus and drives the cubs off. This forms the 2-year reproductive cycle of Formosan black bears.

== Conservation ==
=== Hunter and hunted ===
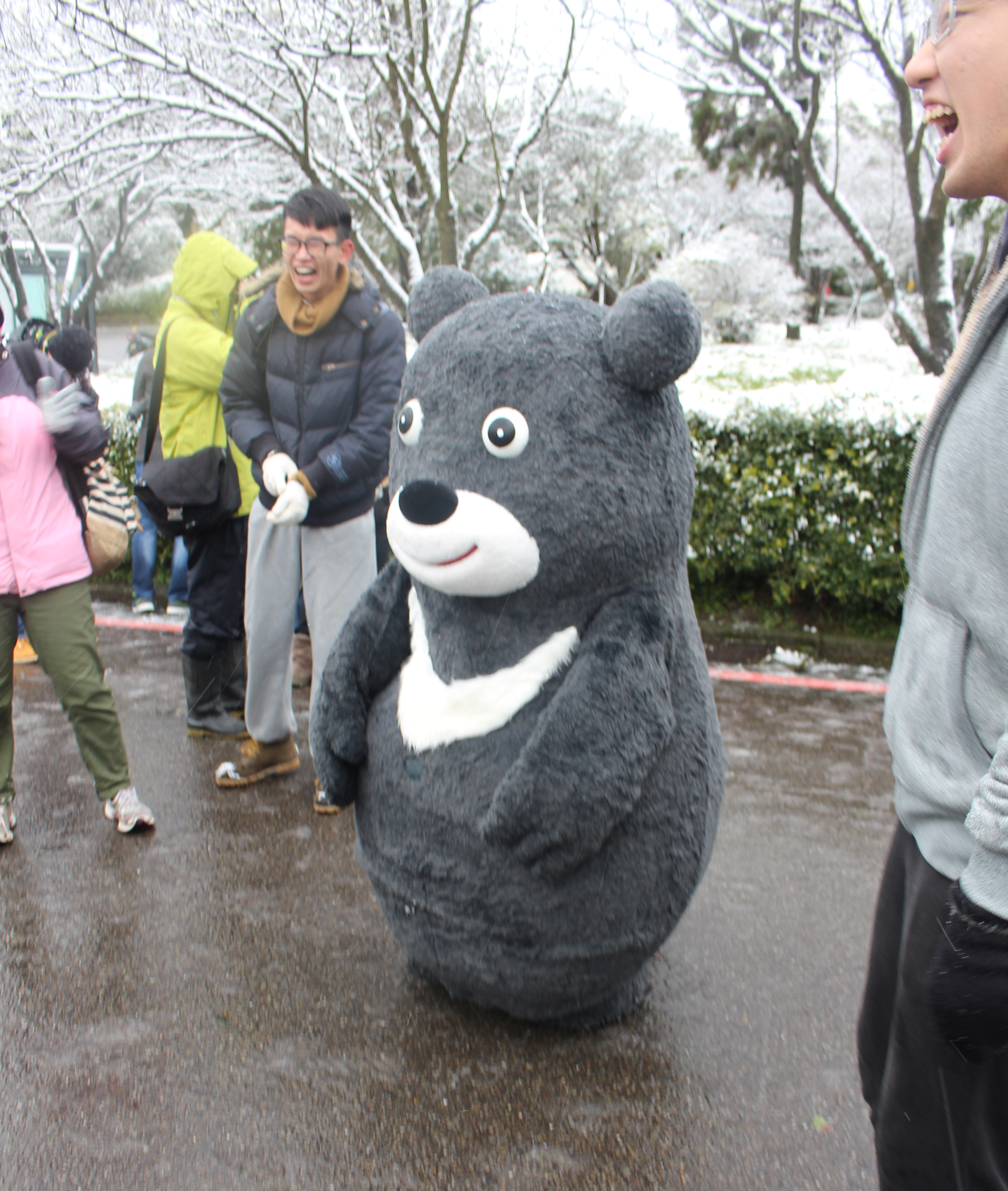
Mascot of Formosan Black Bear at Yangmingshan National Park in Taipei, Taiwan

Formosan black bears (臺灣黑熊) and Formosan clouded leopards (臺灣雲豹) — two of the largest terrestrial mammals on the island of Taiwan — used to roam over the ranges and mountains of Taiwan. However, while the leopard is now extinct, the bear, though endangered, has survived. According to research by the Institute of Wildlife Conservation, National Pingtung University of Science and Technology, this may be due to the myths and traditional taboos of Taiwanese aborigines.

Bunun people call black bears Aguman or Duman, which means the devil. If a Bunun hunter's trap accidentally traps a bear, he has to build a cottage in the mountains and burn the body of the bear there. He also has to stay in the cottage alone away from the village until the millet harvest is finished. Rukai and Paiwan people are allowed to hunt bears, but the hunters have to pay the price of carrying the ancient curse in return. Rukai people believe hunting bears can result in disease. Also, not everyone is allowed to eat bear meat, and children are strictly forbidden to do so. In Taroko (Truku) legend, Formosan black bears are respectful "kings of the forest", whose white marks on their chests represent the moon. The Taroko people believe that killing black bears results in family disaster. In general, among these hunting tribes, hunters of boars are respected as heroes, while hunters of bears are considered losers.

=== Endangered species ===
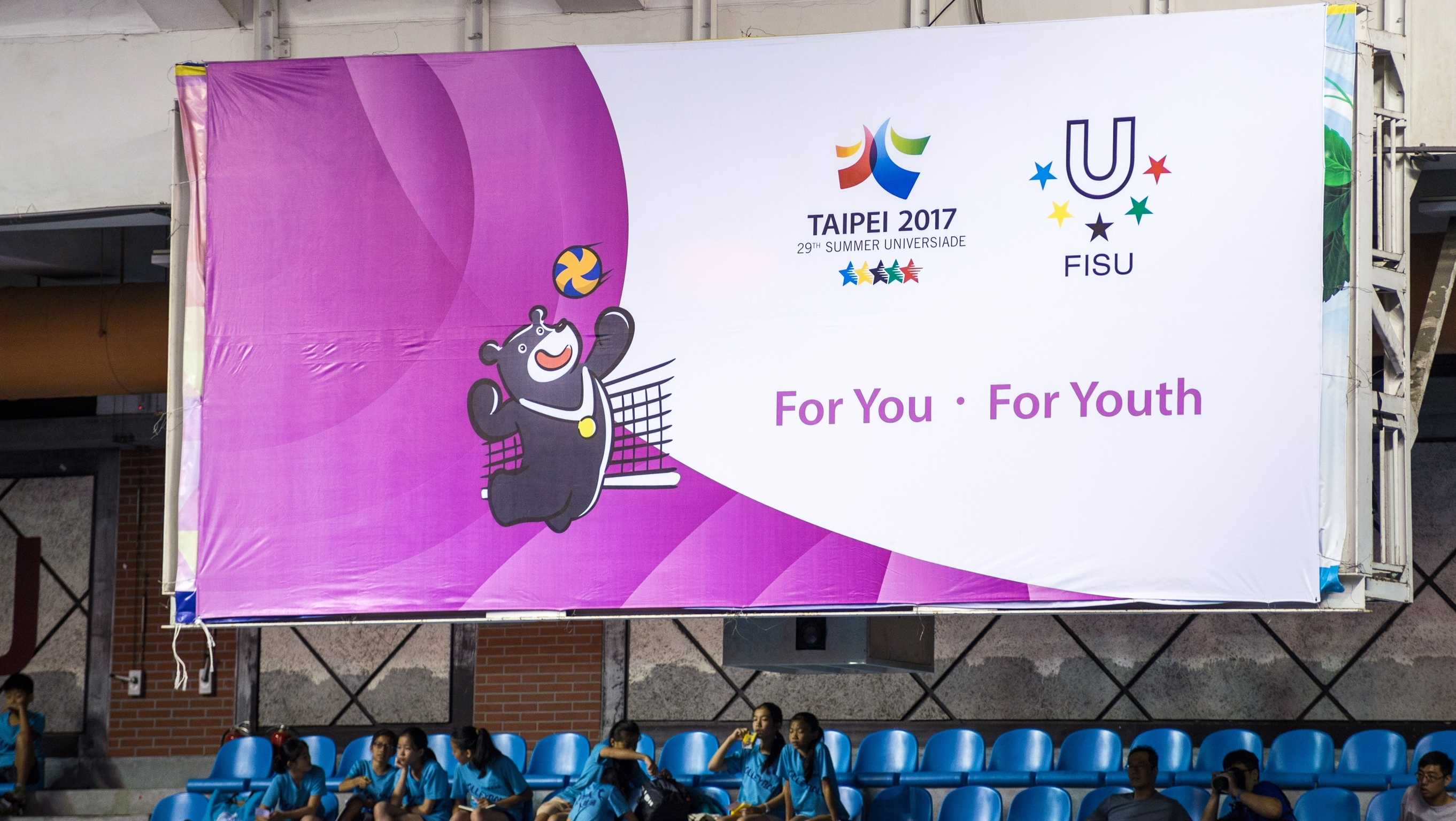
Mascot of the 2017 Summer Universiade held in Taipei, Taiwan

From 1998 to 2000, 15 Formosan black bears were captured and radio collared in Yushan National Park. Reported bear sightings are very infrequent and no one knows exactly how many bears still exist. The species has been legally protected since 1989 but illegal hunting continues and such poaching continues to threaten Formosan black bear populations. For example, eight of fifteen bears captured in the above survey had missing toes or paws, caused by illegal traps.

Since 1989, Formosan black bears have been listed as endangered animals and protected by Taiwan's Cultural Heritage Preservation Law (文化資產保存法). Internationally, the entire species of Asiatic black bear is listed on Appendix I of CITES. CITES bans all international trade of any products from this species. The species is also listed on the red list of the International Union for Conservation of Nature and Natural Resources (IUCN) as vulnerable.

An indigenous Bunun hunter once said, "If there were no bears in the mountains, the forest would look empty and I would feel lonely." Mei-Hsiu Hwang of Institute of Wildlife Conservation, a campaigner for black-bear preservation, also said: "We do not wish to lose this soul of Taiwan's mountains. We do not wish our offspring to see them only in the zoo or in history books."

There is still hope for the Formosan black bear. In 2009, Lin Yuan-Yuan (a member of Yushan National Park's black bear conservation group) recorded footage showing a mother bear attempting to help her two cubs cross a rapid near Batongguan Trail in the eastern section of Tafen (塔芬). In 2026, two separate recordings in Beinan Township were reported by the Taitung branch of Taiwan's Forestry and Nature Conservation Agency.

== Popular culture ==
In 2001, they were voted the most representative wildlife of Taiwan in a half-year-long countrywide voting campaign.

Taiwanese pilots have worn morale patches which feature a Formosan black bear punching Winnie-the-Pooh (representing Xi Jinping) in the face.

The Formosan black bear is the symbol of Kuma Academy (also known as the Black Bear Academy), a Taiwanese non-profit civil defense organization.

== See also ==
- List of protected species in Taiwan
- List of endemic species of Taiwan
- List of national animals
