= Formosa (bacterium) =

Scientific classification
- Domain: Bacteria
- Kingdom: Pseudomonadati
- Phylum: Bacteroidota
- Class: Flavobacteriia
- Order: Flavobacteriales
- Family: Flavobacteriaceae
- Genus: Formosa; Ivanova et al. 2004

Species
- F. agariphila F. algae F. arctica F. haliotis F. maritima F. sediminum F. undariae

Synonyms
- Pseudocytophaga

Bacterium

Formosa is a genus of gram-negative bacteria from the family of Flavobacteriaceae.
