= Formosa (surname) =

Formosa is a surname that comes from Southern Europe found predominantly in Malta, Spain, Portugal, Spanish colonies, and other Mediterranean countries.

The name derives from the Latin name Formosus and the Spanish word fermoso, meaning "beautiful".

Formosa, as the island of Taiwan was formerly known in the West, has the same linguistic origin: from the Portuguese Ilha Formosa ([ˌiʎɐ fuɾˈmɔzɐ]), "beautiful island".

Notable people with the surname include:

- Feliu Formosa (born 1934), Catalan dramatist, poet and translator
- Gil Formosa (born 1959), French cartoonist and illustrator
- Joann Formosa (born 1961), Australian Para-equestrian
- John Formosa (1869–1941), Maltese theologian, canonist, minor philosopher, and poet
- Luis Manresa Formosa (1915–2010), Guatemalan prelate of Roman Catholic Society of Jesus
- Ric Formosa (born 1954), Australian composer and musician

== Sources ==
- http://www.searchmalta.com/surnames/formosa/FORMOSA.doc
