= Taiwanese language (disambiguation) =

Taiwanese language is a name for Taiwanese Hokkien.

Taiwanese language may also refer to:

- Formosan languages, languages of the indigenous and aboriginal peoples of Taiwan
- Taiwanese Hakka, Hakka language in Taiwan
- Taiwanese Mandarin, Standard Mandarin Chinese spoken in Taiwan
- Modern Taiwanese Language (MTL) or Modern Literal Taiwanese (MLT), a Romanization system for Taiwanese Hokkien
- Taiwanese Language Phonetic Alphabet (TLPA), Romanization system for both Hakka and Hokkien

== See also ==
- Languages of Taiwan
