= Nectouxia =

Scientific classification
- Kingdom: Plantae
- Clade: Tracheophytes
- Clade: Angiosperms
- Clade: Eudicots
- Clade: Asterids
- Order: Solanales
- Family: Solanaceae
- Genus: Nectouxia; Kunth
- Species: N. formosa

Binomial name
- Nectouxia formosa Kunth

Synonyms
- Nectouxia bella Miers

Species of flowering plant

Nectouxia is a monotypic genus of flowering plants belonging to the family Solanaceae. The only species is Nectouxia formosa. It is in the Solanoideae subfamily and in Subtribe Salpichroinae, which is a subtribe of Physaleae.

Its native range is found in Texas, USA and Mexico.

The genus name of Nectouxia is in honour of Hippolyte Nectoux (1759–1836), a French botanist, botanical garden director in Santo Domingo. He was also head gardener in Fontainebleau and founded a botanical garden in Rome. The Latin specific epithet of formosa is derived from formosus meaning (well-)formed and/or beautiful. Both the genus and species were first described and published in F.W.H.von Humboldt, A.J.A.Bonpland & C.S.Kunth, Nov. Gen. Sp. Vol.3 on page 10 in 1818.
