= Lala Mountain =

Mountain in Taiwan

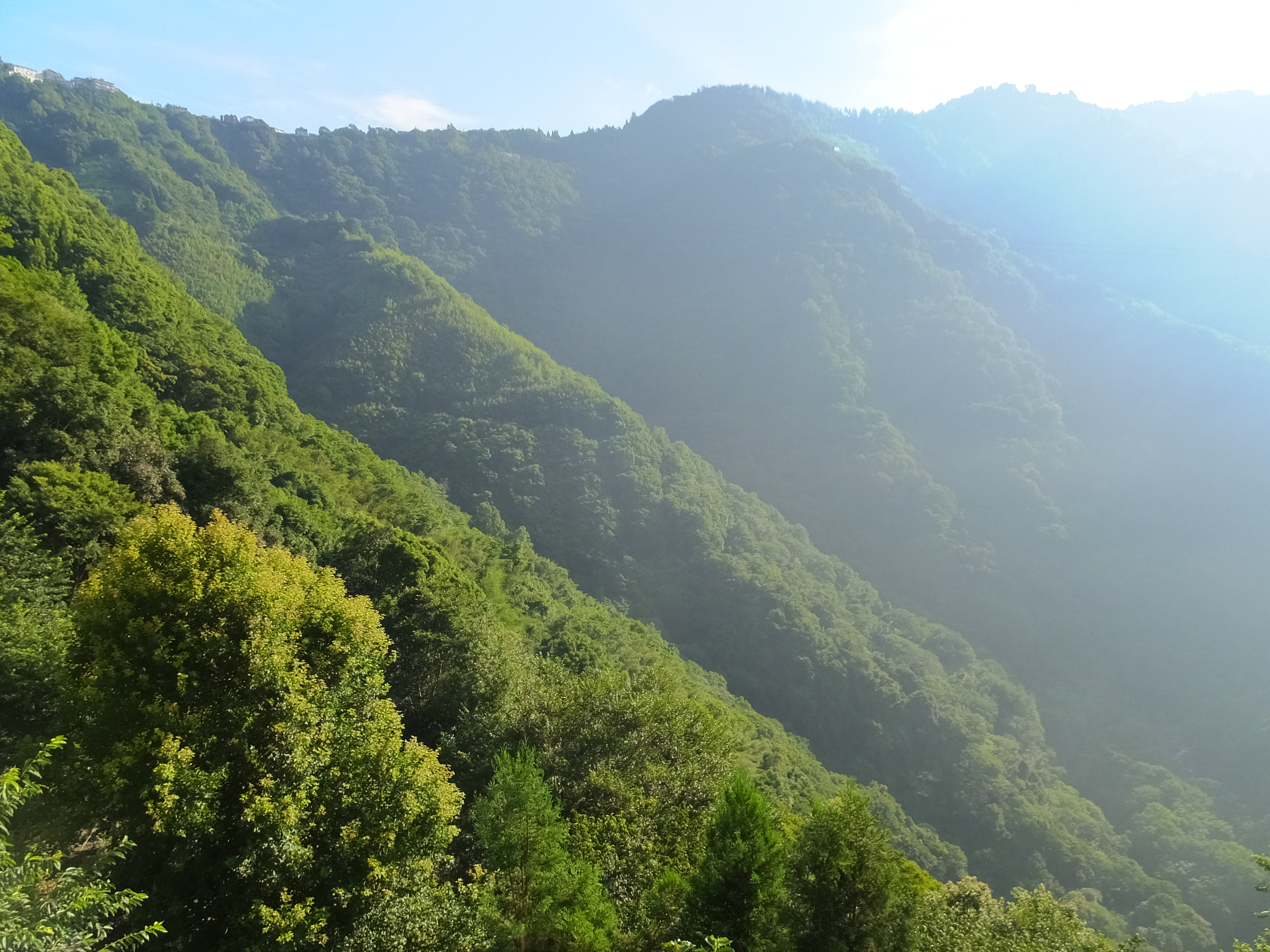

Highest point
- Elevation: 2,031 m (6,663 ft)
- Coordinates: 24°43′47.59″N 121°25′19.12″E

Naming
- Native name: 拉拉山 (Chinese)

Geography
- Location within Taiwan
- Location: Taoyuan City and New Taipei City, Taiwan

Geology
- Mountain type: Mountain

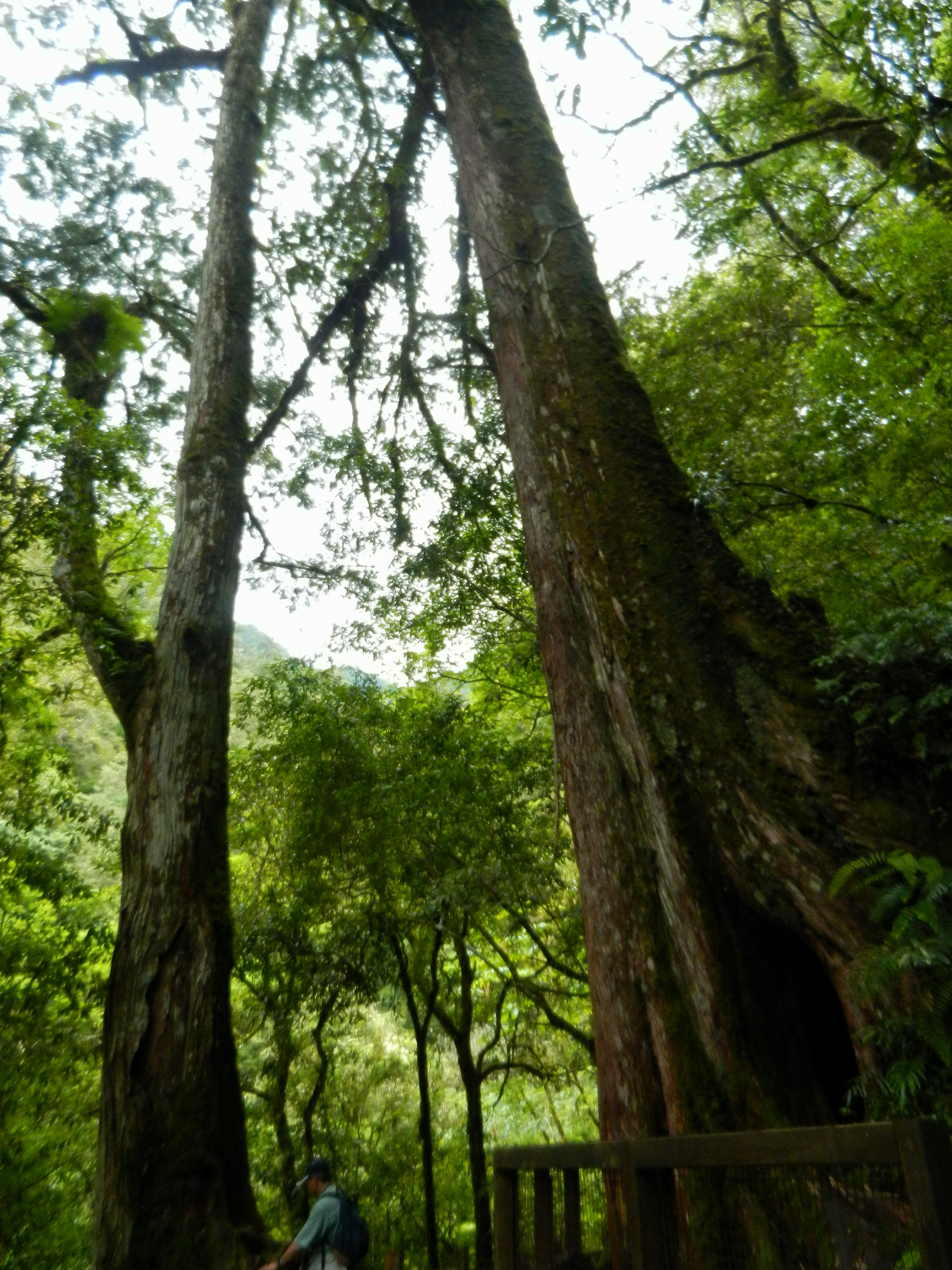
Lala Mountain Forest Reserve

Lala Mountain (Chinese: 拉拉山; pinyin: Lālā shān), also known as Daguan Mountain (Chinese: 達觀山; pinyin: Dáguān Shān), this mountain in Taiwan, located at the junction of Fuxing District, Taoyuan City and Wulai District, New Taipei City, with an elevation of 2,031 meters (6,663 ft). Lala Mountain is one of Taiwan's "natural protection zones," including 500- to 2,800-year-old divine trees and the "No. 5 Divine Tree," which predates Confucius.

== Etymology ==
The term "Lala" in the Atayal language "R'ra" originally meant "to look into the distance on tiptoe". Due to the high terrain, it was the commanding height of the early local Atayal tribe male watch tribe and monitoring enemy invasion, so the Atayal people called the local R'ra. However, according to the field investigation conducted by Ushinosuke Mori during the Japanese Occupation era, "Lala" means "sword" in Atayal, and "Lala Mountain" means "Sword Mountain". Another meaning of the "Lala Mountain" is "beautiful" in the language of the Taiya people.
