= Cake Wars =

American reality competition television series

- Starring: Jonathan Bennett, Ron Ben-Israel, Waylynn Lucas, Richard Ruskell
- Country of origin: United States
- No. of seasons: 5
- No. of episodes: 55

Production
- Executive producer: Chris Losnegard
- Running time: 60 minutes

Original release
- Network: Food Network
- Release: June 29, 2015 – March 27, 2017

Cake Wars is an American reality competition series that was first broadcast on June 29, 2015, aired on Food Network. Jonathan Bennett hosted the competition, where four bakers face off to have their cakes featured in a special event, in addition to a $10,000 prize. Star pastry chefs Waylynn Lucas, Ron Ben-Israel and Richard Ruskell judge which cakes are worthy of headlining parties for pop culture media such as The Simpsons, The Sound of Music, DC Comics, and more. The first and fifth seasons of the show ran for eight episodes and later seasons of the show ran for thirteen episodes. There was also an annual Christmas-themed spin-off of the show called Cake Wars: Christmas, which made its debut the same year as Cake Wars.

It was announced on December 2, 2015, that Cake Wars was renewed for a second season. The new season featured themes that included Star Wars, Dr. Seuss, and Willy Wonka cakes.

== Premise ==
The show is almost identical to Cupcake Wars, except that the contestants design their creations out of regular cakes instead of cupcakes and there are two rounds instead of three. The first round is called "Batter Up," and the contestants are required to choose a certain number of ingredients that go with the episode's theme. One contestant is eliminated after the first round, and in the second round (called "Cake Off"), each of the teams is given two more assistants to help them make their biggest creations and improve any mistakes they may have made in the first round. Before the winner is announced, one person of the three remaining contestants is eliminated, and the winner is chosen from the two remaining contestants.

== Theme ==
The show invites cake bakers from all over the United States to compete. Each episode is centered on the theme or event; past themes include a birthday party for baby hippo from the Los Angeles Zoo, a party for the forty-fifth anniversary of the classic film Willy Wonka and the Chocolate Factory and a film festival, etc.

== Judges ==
Just like in Cupcake Wars, almost every episode of Cake Wars has three judges (some have four judges), two of whom are permanent judges. The guest judge(s) is usually someone who has something to do with the event for the episode, or at least someone who fits in with the theme of the episode. All the judges have the opportunity to constructively critique the cake competitors after each round of battle. The three permanent judges are:

- Ron Ben-Israel: Owner of Ron Ben-Israel Cakes in New York City and the former host of Sweet Genius (Seasons 1–3). In the "Garfield" and "Where's Waldo" episodes, Cupcake Wars judge Florian Bellanger filled in for Ron, and in Seasons 4-5, cake artist Richard Ruskell took Ron's place.
- Waylynn Lucas: With voice actress-turned-baker, Nancy Truman, Waylynn Lucas was the former co-founder of "Fonuts," a healthier spin on the traditional coffee-and-donut shop. In the "Sound of Music" episode, Amy Berman filled in for Waylynn.

== Episode guide ==
=== Season 1 (2015) ===
No.	Title	Theme/Event	Guest judges	Air date
1	"The Simpsons"	Event celebrating the success of The Simpsons	Matt Selman, show writer	June 29, 2015
2	"DC Comics"	Opening of a new DC Comics headquarters	Dan DiDio, Jim Lee, and Geoff Johns, artist, executive editor, and writer, respectively	July 6, 2015
3	"The Knot"	theknot.com wedding	Taylor Sinclair and Samantha Carisch (husband and wife)	July 13, 2015
4	"Nintendo"	Promotional event for Wii U's Super Mario Maker video game	Krysta Yang, Assistant Manager of Public Relations for Nintendo of America	July 20, 2015
5	"Hello Kitty"	Launch of Hello Kitty's North American tour	Katherine McNamara, actress	July 27, 2015
6	"LEGO"	LEGO flagship store event	Michael McNally, Senior Director of Brand Relations for The Lego Group	Aug 3, 2015
7	"The Sound of Music"	50th anniversary of The Sound of Music	Angela Cartwright and Kym Karath, actresses from the film	Aug 10, 2015
8	"Girl Scouts"	100th anniversary of the Girl Scouts' Gold Award	Katherine Hightower, Girl Scouts	Aug 17, 2015

=== 2015 Christmas special ===
No.	Title	Theme/Event	Guest judges	Air date
1	"Christmas: Ultimate Christmas Lights"	Inspired by Frozen and Christmas lights	Chris Buck, film director	Nov 9, 2015
2	"Christmas: Who's Coming Down the Chimney?"	Inspired by ugly Christmas sweaters	Chanda Bell and Christa Pitts, founders of The Elf on the Shelf	Nov 16, 2015
3	"Christmas: Santa's New Ride"	Inspired by Christmas elves and Santa's sleigh	Joy Cho, founder and creative director for Oh Joy!	Nov 23, 2015
4	"Christmas: Holiday Song"	Inspired by outer space and Christmas carols	Devin Ratray, actor who played Buzz in Home Alone	Nov 30, 2015
5	"Christmas: Charlie Brown Celebrates"	50th anniversary of A Charlie Brown Christmas	Lindsey Schulz, author and granddaughter of Peanuts creator Charles M. Schulz	Dec 7, 2015
6	"Christmas: Ultimate Gingerbread House"	Inspired by snow globes and gingerbread houses	Monica Potter, actress	Dec 14, 2015

=== Season 2 (2016) ===
No.	Title	Theme/Event	Guest judges	Air date
1	"Star Wars"	Release of Disney Infinity 3.0, which focuses on the Star Wars franchise	John Vignocchi, VP of Development for Disney Infinity	Jan 11, 2016
2	"Dr. Seuss"	Post-humous publication of What Pet Should I Get? by Dr. Seuss	Susan Brandt, President of Dr. Seuss Enterprises	Jan 18, 2016
3	"Kung Fu Panda 3"	Release of Kung Fu Panda 3	Alessandro Carloni and Jennifer Yuh Nelson, film directors	Jan 25, 2016
4	"Minecraft"	Event celebrating the success of Minecraft	Lydia Winters, Brand Director for Minecraft	Feb 1, 2016
5	"Valentine's Day"	Wine tasting event for Valentine's Day	Jonathan Grahm, chocolatier	Feb 8, 2016
6	"Shark Lagoon"	Aquarium of the Pacific's Shark Lagoon nights	Luke Richmond, Creative Arts & Science Education Supervisor at the Aquarium of the Pacific	Feb 15, 2016
7	"Shrek"	15th anniversary of Shrek	Gina Shay, film producer	Feb 22, 2016
8	"Party Animals"	First birthday celebration for Rosie the hippo at Los Angeles Zoo	John Lewis, Director of the Los Angeles Zoo	Feb 29, 2016
9	"Sesame Street"	Celebrating the 46th season of Sesame Street	Carol-Lynn Parente, Executive Producer of Sesame Street and Cookie Monster	Mar 7, 2016
10	"Willy Wonka"	45th anniversary of Willy Wonka & the Chocolate Factory	Paris Themmen, actor who played Mike Teevee	Mar 14, 2016
11	"Archie"	75 years of Archie comics	John L. Goldwater, CEO of Archie Comics	Mar 21, 2016
12	"Dinosaurs"	Event at the Natural History Museum of Los Angeles County "World of Dinosaurs" exhibit	Jesse Daniel, Supervisor of Floor Interpretation at the Natural History Museum of Los Angeles County	Mar 28, 2016
13	"Alice in Wonderland"	65th anniversary of Disney's Alice in Wonderland	Mike Gabriel, Production Designer and filmmaker at Walt Disney Animation Studios	April 4, 2016

=== Season 3 (2016) ===
No.	Title	Theme/Event	Guest judges	Air date
1	"Captain America"	75th birthday of Captain America	Stephen Wacker, VP of Animation at Marvel Entertainment	June 6, 2016
2	"SpongeBob"	Nickelodeon event celebrating SpongeBob SquarePants	Tom Kenny, voice of SpongeBob	June 13, 2016
3	"Charlie Brown's All-Stars"	50th anniversary of Charlie Brown's All Stars!	Lindsey Schulz, author and granddaughter of Peanuts creator Charles M. Schulz	June 20, 2016
4	"How to Train Your Dragon"	Celebrating the success of How to Train Your Dragon	Art Brown and Doug Sloan, executive producers of Dragons: Race to the Edge	June 27, 2016
5	"Emoji"	Event celebrating emoji	Gedeon Maheux, co-founder of The Iconfactory	July 11, 2016
6	"Cobra's Curse"	Grand opening of Busch Gardens Tampa Bay's new ride Cobra's Curse	Brian Morrow, VP of Theme Park Experience at Busch Gardens	July 18, 2016
7	"Beauty and the Beast"	25th anniversary of Disney's Beauty and the Beast	Paige O'Hara, voice of Belle	July 25, 2016
8	"Halo"	2016 Halo World Championships	Larry "Major Nelson" Hyrb, Director of Programming for Microsoft	Aug 1, 2016
9	"Madeline"	77th anniversary of Madeline	Kate Clark, founder of Yottoy	Aug 8, 2016
10	"Jelly Belly"	Event celebrating Jelly Belly	Lisa Rowland Brasher, Jelly Belly CEO	Aug 22, 2016
11	"Paddington"	90th birthday of Michael Bond, who wrote the Paddington Bear series	R.W. Alley, Paddington illustrator	Aug 22, 2016
12	"Where's Waldo"	Event celebrating the Where's Waldo? animated series	Brian Robinson, Head of Creative Design and Development for DreamWorks Animation	Aug 29, 2016
13	"Garfield"	38th birthday of Garfield	Gregg Berger, voice of Odie	Sep 5, 2016

=== 2016 Christmas special ===
No.	Title	Theme/Event	Guest judges	Air date
1	"Christmas: Santa's Makeover"	Inspired by Christmas gifts and Santa Claus	Megan Nicole, singer-songwriter and actress	Nov 14, 2016
2	"Christmas: How the Grinch Stole Christmas"	50th anniversary of How the Grinch Stole Christmas!	Susan Brandt, President of Dr. Seuss Enterprises	Nov 21, 2016
3	"Christmas: The Nutcracker"	Inspired by The Nutcracker	Tamera Mowry, actress and host of The Real	Nov 26, 2016
4	"Christmas: Animals Celebrate Christmas Too"	Inspired by animals	Yolanda Gampp, cake artist and host of How to Cake It	Dec 5, 2016
5	"Christmas: Santa's Workshop"	Inspired by Santa's workshop	Jackie Sorkin, candy artist and television personality	Dec 12, 2016
6	"Christmas: Ultimate Christmas Front Yard"	Inspired by Christmas cards and Christmas yard decorations	Kristi Yamaguchi, Olympic gold medalist in figure skating	Dec 19, 2016

=== Season 4 (2016-2017) ===
No.	Title	Theme/Event	Guest judges	Air date
1	"Powerpuff Girls"	Event celebrating The Powerpuff Girls, featuring the reboot	Amanda Leighton, Kristen Li, and Natalie Palamides, voice actresses of Blossom, Bubbles, and Buttercup	Sep 12, 2016
2	"Wonder Woman"	75th anniversary of Wonder Woman	Nicola Scott, comic book artist	Sep 19, 2016
3	"The Addams Family"	78th anniversary of The Addams Family	Kevin Miserocchi, Director of the Tee and Charles Addams Foundation	Oct 10, 2016
4	"Magic"	Event celebrating magic	Mat Franco, magician	Oct 17, 2016
5	"Trolls"	Release of DreamsWorks Animation's film Trolls	Walt Dohrn and Mike Mitchell, film directors	Oct 24, 2016
6	"Transformers"	Event celebrating Transformers	Simon Waters, Senior VP of Global Brand Licensing for Hasbro	Oct 31, 2016
7	"Rugrats"	25th anniversary of Rugrats	E. G. Daily, voice of Tommy Pickles	Nov 7, 2016
8	"Space Jam"	20th anniversary of Space Jam	Bill Farmer, voice of Sylvester, Yosemite Sam, and Foghorn Leghorn in the film	Nov 7, 2016
9	"Rose Bowl"	Inspired by the Rose Bowl Game	Lawrence Jackson, former NFL player and 2008 Rose Bowl champion with USC	Dec 26, 2016
10	"Teenage Mutant Ninja Turtles"	Event celebrating the Teenage Mutant Ninja Turtles reboot	Mae Whitman and Greg Cipes, voice actors of April O'Neil and Michelangelo, respectively	Jan 2, 2017
11	"Happy Feet"	Happy Feet 10th anniversary celebration at the Aquarium of the Pacific	Luke Richmond, Creative Arts & Science Education Supervisor at the Aquarium of the Pacific	Jan 16, 2017
12	"Monopoly"	Event celebrating Monopoly	Rebecca Hollander, Monopoly Brand Director at Hasbro	Jan 23, 2017
13	"Roald Dahl"	100th birthday of Roald Dahl	Chloe Dahl, Roald Dahl's granddaughter	Jan 30, 2017

=== Cake Wars Champs (2017) ===
No.	Title	Theme/Event	Guest judges	Air date
1	"Champs: Happy Birthday, Dr. Seuss!"	Dr. Seuss' 113th birthday and the 20th anniversary of the Read Across America campaign	Susan Brandt, President of Dr. Seuss Enterprises	Feb 12, 2017
2	"Champs: The Avengers"	Release of volumes 2 and 3 of Avengers: Monsters Unleashed	Stephen Wacker, VP of Animation at Marvel Entertainment	Feb 19, 2017
3	"Champs: Shrek"	10th anniversary of Shrek the Third	Fernanda Abarca, DreamsWorks animator	Feb 26, 2017
4	"Champs: LEGO"	Event celebrating LEGO	Amanda Santoro, Senior Manager of Brand Relations at The Lego Group	Mar 5, 2017
5	"Champs: Pokemon"	Event celebrating Pokémon	Elvin Gee, Marketing Manager for Pokémon	Mar 19, 2017
6	"Saban's Power Rangers"	Release of Power Rangers	Becky G, actress who played the Yellow Ranger	Mar 20, 2017
7	"Champs: Disney Princesses"	Event celebrating Disney Princesses	Brittney Lee, visual artist at Walt Disney Animation Studios	Mar 26, 2017
8	"Smurfs: The Lost Village"	Release of Smurfs: The Lost Village	Kelly Asbury, director of the film	Mar 27, 2017

== Contestants ==
=== Season 1 (2015) ===
No.	Title	4th place	3rd place	2nd place	1st place
1	"The Simpsons"	Victoria Stilwell; Lakewood, California; Cake Star	Danielle Keene; Pasadena, California; Sheila Mae	Jennifer Johnson; Wellington, Florida; Johnson's Custom Cakes & More	Steven Barela; Denver, Colorado; Child's Pastry Shop
2	"DC Comics"	Diego Guerrero; Anaheim, California; Cinderella Cakes	Anthony Valerio; Pasadena, California; ConfeXion Cupcakes + Cake	Erin Erler; Haverhill, Massachusetts; Cakes by Erin	Jennifer Duncan; San Diego, California; Cake
3	"The Knot"	Dana Herbert; Newark, Delaware; Desserts by Dana	Bree Miller; Reseda, California; Bree's Bakery	Hollis Wilder; Orlando, Florida; Good Golly Miss Holly	Kristina Serfass; Seattle, Washington; Baked
4	"Nintendo"	Sonia George; Los Angeles, California; Cake Studio LA	Donna Lawson; Seattle, Washington; Stuffed Cakes	Glenn Quirion; Boston, Massachusetts; Sweet Tooth Boston	Cory Pohlman; Los Angeles, California; Bohnhoff & Kent
5	"Hello Kitty"	Danny Lane; Fort Smith, Arkansas; Happs Food	Leslie Poyourow; Bethesda, Maryland; Fancy Cakes by Leslie	Erin Eason; Kirkland, Washington; Cake Art Company	Viki Kane; Encinitas, California; SugarKane Cakes & Confections
6	"LEGO"	Lauren Lee; Dallas, Texas; Lala's Cakes	Aaron Arevalo; Fremont, California; Misery Loves Co. Cakes	Jackie Bishop; Greenville, South Carolina; Art Eats Bakery	Janelle Copeland; Glendora, California; The Cake Mamas
7	"The Sound of Music"	Victoria Donnelly; Boston, Massachusetts; Cakeology	Rolan Toumanian; Glendale, California; Royal Cakes	Stevi Auble; San Diego, California; Hey There, Cupcake!	Mike Elder; Kansas City, Missouri; Black Sheep Custom Cakes
8	"Girl Scouts"	Monica Cunningham; San Bernardino, California; Moni's Sweets	Laura Burt; Salt Lake City, Utah; Honey B's Boutique and Baked Goods	Laura Amodeo; Detroit, Michigan; Elegance in Sugar	Ron Barham; Hawthorne, California; Cake Man Ron

=== 2015 Christmas special ===
No.	Title	Eliminated	Winner: Stocking Stuffer	Winner: Santa's Mega Challenge
1	"Christmas: Ultimate Christmas Lights"	Elves with Attitude; Teri Tarbox, Waldorf, Maryland; Candy Knappenberger, Lehighton, Pennsylvania; John Price, Atlanta, Georgia	Mistletoes of Mayhem; Callie Speer, Austin, Texas; Jon Neill, Hollywood, California; Steve Weiss, Martinsburg, West Virginia	Jack Frosters; Beth Townsend, St. Augustine, Florida; Stephan Baity, Akron, Ohio; Frederick "Freddy" Isla, Las Vegas, Nevada
2	"Christmas: Who's Coming Down the Chimney?"	Santa's Misfits; Michele Guerra, Vacaville, California; Guido Michael, San Diego, California; Melodie Walenius, Midlothian, Virginia	Santa's Little Chefs; Jonathon Michael, Cincinnati, Ohio; Corinna Valdez, San Diego, California; JoAnn Maguire, Frederick, Maryland	We Three Kings; David Smith, Westerville, Ohio; Travis Martinez, Las Vegas, Nevada; Robert Teddy, Las Vegas, Nevada
3	"Christmas: Santa's New Ride"	Merry Makers; Nils Rowland, St. Augustine, Florida; Christina Bisbee, Farmingdale, New York; Jim Victor, Philadelphia, Pennsylvania	Merry Makers; Nils Rowland, St. Augustine, Florida; Christina Bisbee, Farmingdale, New York; Jim Victor, Philadelphia, Pennsylvania	Jack Frosters; Beth Townsend, St. Augustine, Florida; Stephan Baity, Akron, Ohio; Frederick "Froggy" Isla, Las Vegas, Nevada
4	"Christmas: Holiday Song"	Santa's Little Chefs; Jonathon Michael, Cincinnati, Ohio; Corinna Valdez, Frederick, Maryland; JoAnn Maguire, Frederick, Maryland	Mistletoes of Mayhem; Callie Speer, Austin, Texas; Jon Neill, Hollywood, California; Steve Weiss, Martinsburg, West Virginia	We Three Kings; David Smith, Westerville, Ohio; Travis Martinez, Las Vegas, Nevada; Robert Teddy, Las Vegas, Nevada
5	"Christmas: Charlie Brown Celebrates"	Mistletoes of Mayhem; Callie Speer, Austin, Texas; Jon Neill, Hollywood, California; Steve Weiss, Martinsburg, West Virginia	Mistletoes of Mayhem; Callie Speer, Austin, Texas; Jon Neill, Hollywood, California; Steve Weiss, Martinsburg, West Virginia	We Three Kings; David Smith, Westerville, Ohio; Travis Martinez, Las Vegas, Nevada; Robert Teddy, Las Vegas, Nevada
6	"Christmas: Ultimate Gingerbread House"	We Three Kings; David Smith, Westerville, Ohio; Travis Martinez, Las Vegas, Nevada; Robert Teddy, Las Vegas, Nevada	We Three Kings; David Smith, Westerville, Ohio; Travis Martinez, Las Vegas, Nevada; Robert Teddy, Las Vegas, Nevada	Jack Frosters; Beth Townsend, St. Augustine, Florida; Stephan Baity, Akron, Ohio; Frederick "Froggy" Isla, Las Vegas, Nevada

=== Season 2 (2016) ===
No.	Title	4th place	3rd place	2nd place	1st place
1	"Star Wars"	Wendy Begy; Spartanburg, South Carolina; Wendy's Custom Cakes	Stephanie Brown; Wayne, Pennsylvania; The Ultimate Bake Shoppe	Jose Barajas; San Diego, California; Mmmm Cakes	Gonzuela Bastarache; Moncton, New Brunswick, Canada; The KupKake Tree
2	"Dr. Seuss"	Lovely Carandang; San Diego, California; LovelysSinfully SweetCreations	Cameron Tinker; Lexington, Kentucky; Tinker's Cake Shop	Sarah Watts; Gainesville, Florida; Sugar Mama's Sweets	Melissa Zunich; Delta, Colorado; Sweet Cheeks Cakery
3	"Kung Fu Panda 3"	Antoine Lee; Clinton, Maryland; Pro Cakes	Darla Swain; Chino Hills, California; Darla's Cake Design	Samantha Kestin; Springfield, New Jersey; Sweet Samantha	Liz Huber; Ormond Beach, Florida; Cakery Creation
4	"Minecraft"	Mara Finger; Tullahoma, Tennessee; Lickity Split Cakes	Karolyn Plummer; Inglewood, California; Sweet Red Peach Custom Cakes and Pastries	Ebony Schoenfeldt; Chesapeake, Virginia; Tutu Cute Cakes	Emily Bartlow; Grove City, Pennsylvania
5	"Valentine's Day"	Beth Hassman; San Dimas, California; Truly Scrumptious Cakes by Beth	Van French Jr.; Langhorne, Pennsylvania; Van Earl’s Cakes	Jenna Siebert; St. Louis, Missouri; The Sweet Divine	Renata Papadopoulos; Stratford, Connecticut; Lovely Cakes
6	"Shark Lagoon"	Jaime Lavallee; Thousand Oaks, California; Jaime Cakes	Debbie Church; Woodbridge, Virginia; My Delicate Creations	Edet Okon; Houston, Texas	Sabrina Campbell; Alexandria, Virginia; Occasionally Cake
7	"Shrek"	Jockan Jordan; New Orleans, Louisiana; Dat Cake Place	Eleana Perez; Los Angeles, California; Ele Makes Cakes	Juliana Evans; Orlando, Florida; Graciously Sweet	Meghan Smith; Berea, Kentucky; Doodlebug Cake
8	"Party Animals"	Sarah Anthony; Elizabethtown, Kentucky; Sugar Fashion Cakes	Dylan Humphrey; Tyler, Texas; Kool Kakes by Dylan	Heidi Petrilla; Laguna Hills, California; Twinfully Sweet	Nicole Ward; North Richland Hills, Texas; Sinsational Cakes
9	"Sesame Street"	Sarah Lewis; Joplin, Missouri	Beckie Osborn; Claremore, Oklahoma	Stephen Lowry; Las Vegas, Nevada; Showboy Bake Shop	Melissa Rodriguez; New York City, New York; Kynd O' Mello
10	"Willy Wonka"	Abbi Courtemanche; Quechee, Vermont; A to Z Cakes, LLC	Mimi Hood; Washington, DC; Mimi's Mocha Treats	Candace Gonzalez; Redlands, California; Sugarbee Cafe & Bake Shop	Jason Hisley; Baltimore, Maryland; La Cakerie
11	"Archie"	Manny Pruitt; Dallas, Texas; Designs By Cake Daddy	Jaime Williams; Pineville, Louisiana; The Cake Barn	Denise Passarelli; Queens, New York; Denise Makes Cakes	Shantal Der Boghosian; Van Nuys, Los Angeles, California; Shankar Bakery
12	"Dinosaurs"	Tony Albanese; Hackensack, New Jersey; The Pastryarch	Tiffany Davis; Saint Paul, Minnesota; Xtravagant Events & Sweet Treats	Jennifer Richmond; Toms River, New Jersey; Jenni Cakes	Brie Darling; Los Angeles, California; Brie Darling Cakes
13	"Alice in Wonderland"	Kristin Weldon Peri; Glen Mills, Pennsylvania; Divine Cakes, Inc.	Sierra Taylor; Florham Park, New Jersey; Creative Cake Art	Ginger Soave; Virginia Beach, Virginia; The Icing on the Cake	Nathalie Sorensen; San Diego, California; Lucy Cake Design

=== Season 3 (2016) ===
No.	Title	4th place	3rd place	2nd place	1st place
1	"Captain America"	Jeremy "Bubba" Braddock; Watertown, Connecticut; Hardcore Sweet	Janelle Copeland; Glendora, California; The Cake Mamas	Brianna Green; Escondido, California; Cute Cakes Bakery & Cafe	Kayla Trahan; Lafayette, Louisiana; The Cake Room Lafayette
2	"Spongebob"	Tiffany Doran; Palmdale, California; Sweet Dreams Cake N' Things	Kitty Vacha; Seward, Nebraska; Tasteful Indulgence	Lara Halabi Stein; McLean, Virginia; Fluffy Thoughts Cake	Christine Tardiff; Cumberland, Rhode Island; Dyane’s Sweet Tooth
3	"Charlie Brown's All-Stars"	Karen Osterling; Spencerport, New York; Cakes by Karen	Reba Wilson; Carmel, California; Sweet Reba's Custom Cakes	Elizabeth Rowe; Fort Worth, Texas; The London Baker	Kelly Williams; Geismar, Louisiana; Kelly Kaxe
4	"How to Train Your Dragon"	Sharon White; Washington, D.C.; The Cake Courtesan	Daniella Lechuga; Phoenix, Arizona; Cup ‘N Cake	Audrey McGinnis; Frisco, Texas; Every Girl Gourmet	Wiley Saccheri; Redding, California; Sublime Cake Designs
5	"Emoji"	Christy Vega-Gluch; Gilbert, Arizona; Itsy Bitsy Confections	Taylor Kisselstein; Summerfield, North Carolina; Cakes by Tayleigh	Ernesto Materán; Winter Park, Florida; B350 Degrees Pastry Shop	Karin Cakirdas; Cresskill, New Jersey; Keremo Cakes
6	"Cobra's Curse"	Sharad Thompson; Trinidad and Tobago; Morsels Bakery	Jessica Bucceri; Belmar, New Jersey; JB Couture Cupcakes	Angie Bennett; Whitakers, North Carolina; A Memory Worth Making Cakes	Stella Kotsatos-Angelo; Warren, Ohio; The Cake Boutique
7	"Beauty and the Beast"	Laura Leer-Martinez; Modesto, California; Sweet Kisses Cake Co.	Miguel Garcia-Serrano; Orlando, Florida	Elaine Duran; Kissimmee, Florida; Enticing Cake Boutique	Angela Crawley; Peoria, Arizona; Indulge Cakes
8	"Halo"	Tiffanee Lee-Scott; Dover, Delaware; Tiffanee & Co. Bakery	Gilda Burke; Valley Cottage, New York; Jolirose Cake Shop	Karey Large; Whitby, Ontario, Canada; Kake Kreations	Pete Tidwell; Provo, Utah; The Mighty Baker
9	"Madeline"	Monica Hilton; Stone Mountain, Georgia; Eat Mo Cakes	Nancy Vendetti Sepe; Olathe, Kansas; Nancy's Fancies	Akemi Lee Simpson; Fullerton, California; Hapa Cupcakes	Alice Cooke; Yorktown, Virginia; Cakealicious
10	"Jelly Belly"	Rashawn Robinson; Brooklyn, New York; Robinson & Co.	Kristi Caccippio; Lisle, Illinois; Cakes by Kristi	Lacia McKee; Las Vegas, Nevada; HottCakez	Jodi Johnston; Wenatchee, Washington; Cake Chic Studios
11	"Paddington"	Carie Tindill; Auburn, Alabama; Cakeitecture	Holly Webster; Las Vegas, Nevada; Cafe Azure	Lisa Humphreys; Atlanta, Georgia; Couture Cakes, Inc.	Joel P. Basco; Boca Raton, Florida; J&D Cakes
12	"Where's Waldo"	Jodie Lavoie; Castle Rock, Colorado; Sugar Rush Cakery	Paul Massey; Seattle, Washington	Elisa Fusco; New Hope, Pennsylvania; Pudge Cakes	Victoria Maya; Chicago, Illinois; GBD Cakes and Sweets
13	"Garfield"	Yeimy Rios; Rockaway, New Jersey; Sweet-Scapes, LLC	Brandy West; Rancho Cordova, California; Go West Baking & Events	Charlise Johnson; Norcross, Georgia; Intimate Eats	Dan Langan; Havertown, Pennsylvania; Baked by Dan

=== 2016 Christmas Special ===
No.	Title	Eliminated	Winner: Stocking Stuffer	Winner: Santa's Mega Challenge
1	"Christmas: Santa's Makeover"	Fa La La; Nathalie Sorensen, San Diego, California; Tom Lindskog, Eugene, Oregon; Michele Sweeney, Seattle, Washington	Rowdy Reindeer; Lindsey Bickford, San Diego, California; Kim Simons, Liberty, New York; Dean Murray, Kiel, Wisconsin	Winter Wonders; Damien Bagley, Baltimore, Maryland; Carmel Turner, Irmo, South Carolina; Chad Hartson, Napoleon, Ohio
2	"Christmas: How the Grinch Stole Christmas"	Santa's Angels; Joyce Osorio, Brooklyn, New York; Irene Dele-Adejumo, Germantown, Maryland; Vanessa Greeley, Warwick, New York	Winter Wonders; Damien Bagley, Baltimore, Maryland; Carmel Turner, Irmo, South Carolina; Chad Hartson, Napoleon, Ohio	Rowdy Reindeer; Lindsey Bickford, San Diego, California; Kim Simons, Liberty, New York; Dean Murray, Kiel, Wisconsin
3	"Christmas: The Nutcracker"	Tinsel Cake Trio; Liz Kraatz, Windsor, Missouri; Becky Wortman, Spokane, Washington; Jess Parrish, Longmont, Colorado	Rowdy Reindeer; Lindsey Bickford, San Diego, California; Kim Simons, Liberty, New York; Dean Murray, Kiel, Wisconsin	North Star; Joseph Cumm, York, Pennsylvania; Giselle Poserio, Long Beach, California; Brenda Villacorta, New York City, New York
4	"Christmas: Animals Celebrate Christmas Too"	Silent Night Riders; Julian Perrigo-Jimenez, Folsom, California; Lisa Herrera, Denver, Colorado; Ric Testani, Fort Lauderdale, Florida	Winter Wonders; Damien Bagley, Baltimore, Maryland; Carmel Turner, Irmo, South Carolina; Chad Hartson, Napoleon, Ohio	North Star; Joseph Cumm, York, Pennsylvania; Giselle Poserio, Long Beach, California; Brenda Villacorta, New York City, New York
5	"Christmas: Santa's Workshop"	Rowdy Reindeer; Lindsey Bickford, San Diego, California; Kim Simons, Liberty, New York; Dean Murray, Kiel, Wisconsin	Winter Wonders; Damien Bagley, Baltimore, Maryland; Carmel Turner, Irmo, South Carolina; Chad Hartson, Napoleon, Ohio	Winter Wonders; Damien Bagley, Baltimore, Maryland; Carmel Turner, Irmo, South Carolina; Chad Hartson, Napoleon, Ohio
6	"Christmas: Ultimate Christmas Front Yard"	Winter Wonders; Damien Bagley, Baltimore, Maryland; Carmel Turner, Irmo, South Carolina; Chad Hartson, Napoleon, Ohio	North Star; Joseph Cumm, York, Pennsylvania; Giselle Poserio, Long Beach, California; Brenda Villacorta, New York City, New York	North Star; Joseph Cumm, York, Pennsylvania; Giselle Poserio, Long Beach, California; Brenda Villacorta, New York City, New York

=== Season 4 (2016-2017) ===
No.	Title	4th place	3rd place	2nd place	1st place
1	"Powerpuff Girls"	Candy Ramirez; Tucson, Arizona; Queen Bee Baker	Gerardo Chavez; Pembroke Pines, Florida; Cakes, Desserts and Beyond	Heather Rousseau; Frankenmuth, Michigan; SugarHigh Bakery	Linda Caro; Escondido, California; Little Hunny's Cakery
2	"Wonder Woman"	Christina Moda; Bayside, New York; Cakes a la Moda	Eric Woller; DeLand, Florida; Meme’s Treat Boutique	Tammy Tuttle; Sulphur, Louisiana; T-Tuttle Custom Cakes	Viki Kane; Encinitas, California; SugarKane Cakes & Confections
3	"The Addams Family"	Cristina Gutierrez; Houston, Texas; Dulce Cakes and Sweets	Colin O'Dea; Santa Barbara, California; Cakes by Colin	Victoria Andreacchio; Norristown, Pennsylvania; V's Specialty Cakes	Brooke Kichurchak; Medina, Ohio; The Bee’s Knees Custom Cakes
4	"Magic"	Kassie Mather; Cedar Rapids, Iowa; Hy-Vee	Jackie Dinko; New Rochelle, New York; Caked Out Creations	Brie Darling; Los Angeles, California; Brie Darling Cakes	Ann Alaboud; Lakeville, Minnesota; Sweet Treasures
5	"Trolls"	Yvonne Stephens; Chicago, Illinois; Penthouse Sweets	Carie Parker; Woodbridge, Virginia; Cravings Cupcakery	Amanda Raulerson; Toms River, New Jersey; Mandoli’s Custom Cakes	Joyce Marcellus; Lakewood, California; Toxic Sweets Shop
6	"Transformers"	Shantal Der Boghosian; Van Nuys, Los Angeles, California; Shankar Bakery	Samantha Brooks; Long Beach, California; Samicakes Boutique	Dionne Dixon; Arlington, Texas; Cake Bliss	Devin Bennett; Lakewood, California; Sweet Grace Anna’s
7	"Rugrats"	Cary Minor; Fort Worth, Texas; Cary's Creations	Akiko White; Spring Branch, Texas; Akiko White Cake Illustrator	Rose Han; Dublin, California; Rose Dream Cakes	Stephen Lowry; Las Vegas, Nevada; Showboy Bake Shop
8	"Space Jam"	Bob DeLuca; Point Pleasant, New Jersey; The Country Bakery	Jill Taylor; West Jordan, Utah; Sprinklebelle Cakes	Melissa Savino; Avon, New York; The Cake Place	Melissa Rodriguez; New York City, New York; Kynd O' Mello
9	"Rose Bowl"	Laury Saldana; The Bronx, New York City, New York; There Should Always Be Cake	Shengjia Shen; South Plainfield, New Jersey; Give Me a Cake	John Cummings; Naugatuck, Connecticut; StoneHouse Baked Goods	Jennifer Duncan; San Diego, California; Cake
10	"Teenage Mutant Ninja Turtles"	Gillian Marriott; Canon City, Colorado; Sweet Cheeks Cakery	Daniel Colonel; Brooklyn, New York	Porsha Kimble; Forsan, Texas; Your Cake Diva	Monika Stout; Encinitas, California; Truly Scrumptious Cakes
11	"Happy Feet"	Deborah Bradley; Philadelphia, Pennsylvania; Simply Blessed Cakes	Matthew Wohlkinger; Dallas, Texas; Cake-aholics	Angela Cabanyog; Indio, California; Angela’s Cakes	Meghan Smith; Berea, Kentucky; Doodlebug Cake
12	"Monopoly"	Miranda Swafford; Manchester, Kentucky; Rockin' Cakes	Kristen Corridori; Philadelphia, Pennsylvania	Miguel Lomeli; San Diego, California; Pastry Glamm	Lilian Halabi; Harker Heights, Texas; Lily's Cakes
13	"Roald Dahl"	Susie Mendoza; Rancho Cucamonga, California; Havan a Taste	Heather Clarke; Blanding, Utah; Sugar Bee Shae's	Quinnesha Alverez; New Orleans, Louisiana; La Petite Confections	Jeff Taylor; Oxford, Mississippi; Sweet T's Bakery

=== Cake Wars Champs (2017) ===
No.	Title	4th place	3rd place	2nd place	1st place
1	"Champs: Happy Birthday, Dr. Seuss!"	Ron Barham; Hawthorne, California; Cake Man Ron	Cory Pohlman; Los Angeles, California; Bohnhoff & Kent	Jodi Johnston; Wenatchee, Washington; Cake Chic Studios	Kayla Trahan; Lafayette, Louisiana; The Cake Room Lafayette
2	"Champs: The Avengers"	Nicole Ward; North Richland Hills, Texas; Sinsational Cakes	Dan Langan; Havertown, Pennsylvania; Baked by Dan	Devin Bennett; Lakewood, California; Sweet Grace Anna’s	Nathalie Sorensen; San Diego, California; Lucy Cake Design
3	"Champs: Shrek"	Stella Kotsatos-Angelo; Warren, Ohio; The Cake Boutique	Joel P. Basco; Boca Raton, Florida; J&D Cakes	Sabrina Campbell; Woodbridge, Virginia; Simply Sabrina	Jennifer Duncan; San Diego, California; Cake
4	"Champs: LEGO"	Alice Cooke; Yorktown, Virginia; Cakealicious	Emily (Bartlow) Harryman; Dallas, Texas	Linda Caro; Escondido, California; Little Hunny's Cakery	Kristina Serfass; Seattle, Washington; Baked
5	"Champs: Pokemon"	Joyce Marcellus; Lakewood, California; Toxic Sweets Shop	Brooke Kichurchak; Medina, Ohio; The Bee's Knees Custom Cakes	Gonzuela Bastarache; Moncton, New Brunswick, Canada; The KupKake Tree	Melissa Zunich; Delta, Colorado; Sweet Cheeks Cakery
6	"Saban's Power Rangers"	Renata Papadopoulos; Stratford, Connecticut; Lovely Cakes	Liz Huber; Ormond Beach, Florida; Cakery Creation	Jason Hisley; Baltimore, Maryland; La Cakerie	Pete Tidwell; Provo, Utah; The Mighty Baker
7	"Champs: Disney Princesses"	Brie Darling; Los Angeles, California; Brie Darling Cakes	Angela Crawley; Peoria, Arizona; Indulge Cakes	Janelle Copeland; Glendora, California; The Cake Mamas	Jeff Taylor; Oxford, Mississippi; Sweet T's Bakery
8	"Smurfs: The Lost Village"	Meghan Smith; Berea, Kentucky; Doodlebug Cake	Lilian Halabi; Harker Heights, Texas; Lily's Cakes	Viki Kane; Encinitas, California; SugarKane Cakes & Confections	Wiley Saccheri; Redding, California; Sublime Cake Designs

== See also ==
- Cupcake Wars
- Halloween Wars
