= How to Cake It =

YouTube channel featuring Yolanda Gampp

How to Cake It is a digital web show on YouTube that posts videos showcasing Yolanda Gampp creating cakes that look like other objects, as well as baking tutorials. Her cake designs have been featured on various websites and in magazines. How to Cake It has expanded to selling merchandise, holding live workshops, and a second YouTube channel. The main channel has 4 million subscribers and their most popular video has over 12 million views. They upload new videos every Tuesday.

== History ==
The concept of How to Cake It debuted in the form of Food Network's show SugarStars starring Yolanda Gampp. It aimed to be a real-life sitcom, with the contestants making cakes and various sweet treats for big events in Toronto. The show was cancelled by the network after one season consisting of 14 episodes in 2012. The future co-presidents and producers of How to Cake It, Connie Contardi and Jocelyn Mercer wanted to create an entertaining baking show with Yolanda Gampp as the star, after meeting her on SugarStars.

"Connie and I decided to make our exit from television and entry into YouTube, where we could stop asking permission and make a show that we really believed in." — Mercer, 2018

== Personnel ==
=== Yolanda Gampp ===
Inspired by her father who was a baker, Yolanda Gampp (born July 21, 1977) is a self-taught baker and cake designer. She would bake in her mother's small kitchen filling custom orders. She attended George Brown's Culinary Arts Program, a culinary school in Toronto, but soon discovered she preferred baking. By 2005, she had a large enough clientele base to quit her job at a local bakery and focus on growing her own business. Whilst being a contestant on SugarStars, Gampp gave up most of her regular clients as filming was intense and took ten months. The show aired for one season consisting of 14 episodes in 2012, before it was cancelled by the network. Gampp had a brief period of uncertainty towards her career, but soon found she was expecting a child. Contardi and Mercer approached Gampp in early 2014 about creating How to Cake It with Gampp as the star, which she was excited for. How to Cake It posted their first video on February 10, 2015. Gammp has also appeared as a guest judge on baking shows such as Sugar Showdown and Cake Wars.

Gampp has a husband whom she refers to as "Mr. Cake" and a son, born in 2013.

== List of awards ==
- Webby Awards: Online Film & Video – How-to & DIY 2016
