= Denise Verret =

American zookeeper

Denise M. Verret
- Born: Altadena, California
- Education: University of California, Riverside (BA)
- Occupation: Director of the Los Angeles Zoo

Denise M. Verret is the director of the Los Angeles Zoo and Botanical Gardens. She is the first female African American director of an Association of Zoos and Aquariums-accredited institution. She also serves on the board of the Association of Zoos and Aquariums and is a zoo accreditation inspector. She spent 19 years as the Los Angeles Zoo's deputy director before assuming the post of director.

== Early life ==
Verret was born and raised in Altadena, California as the middle child of three sisters and attended schools in Pasadena, California, including John Muir High School. Her mother was a homemaker who eventually gained employment as the accounts payable manager at Huntington Memorial Hospital. Verret's father was a detective on the force of the Los Angeles Police Department.

== Personal life ==
Verret is married to Anthony Verret. The couple have two children, Lauren and Brian. Verret has lived in Arcadia since 2002.

== Education ==
Verret majored in Administrative Studies at UC Riverside, graduating in 1988 with a Bachelor of Science. While still a student, she worked in the university's Office of Early Academic Outreach.

== Career ==
After graduating from the University of California, Riverside, Verret's aunt, who worked for the City of Los Angeles Department of Public Works, encouraged her to pursue an internship with the city. Verret hence obtained an internship in the Office of the City Administrative Officer.

In the Office of the City Administrative Officer, Verret worked in policy analysis with the Department of Recreation and Parks, under which the Los Angeles Zoo operated until 1997. She continued to work for the city for several decades, and was eventually hired as the first deputy director of the Los Angeles Zoo when it separated from the Department of Recreation and Parks. As deputy director, Verret oversaw all areas of the zoo's proceedings including finance, information technology, human resources, administration, admission and guest relations, public relations, planning and development, education, and interpretive programs. She directed and developed the zoo’s strategic and vision plans in this time, also managing the organization's business and marketing plans.

Verret was serving as interim zoo director when Los Angeles Mayor Eric Garcetti nominated her for the position of director; John Lewis, zoo director, had retired in January 2019. Verret was confirmed to the seat of director of the Los Angeles Zoo on June 28, 2019. She previously served 19 years as deputy director of the zoo, with her career totaling 30 years working for the City of Los Angeles.

As zoo director and CEO, Verret is charged with overseeing the redesign and redevelopment of the zoo’s 133-acre campus. She was zoo director during the January 2025 Southern California wildfires. The LA Zoo closed for nine days but did not sustain any significant fire or wind damage.

In October 2024, Verret was named the 100th chair of the Association of Zoos and Aquariums (AZA)'s Board of Directors. She is the first Black woman to serve in the role. She was previously elected to a three-year director term on the AZA board before being selected to serve on its executive committee. Verret has stated that her focus as board chair will be "ensuring that [the AZA continues] to evolve for the next 100 years." She also serves as a zoo accreditation inspector for the AZA.
