= Dan Langan =

American baker

- Born: Philadelphia, Pennsylvania, United States
- Occupation(s): Baker, TV host
- Television: Spring Baking Championship
- Website: www.bakedbydan.com

Dan Langan is an American baker, blogger, television host and television personality. He has appeared in and hosted several baking shows for the Food Network.

== Early life ==
Langan was born in Philadelphia, Pennsylvania. As a child he started baking with his mother and grandmother. In middle school he began teaching himself to decorate cakes In high school Langan worked as a cake decorator at a bakery .

Langan graduated from Marymount Manhattan College in 2012. The same year, he started his blog, Baked By Dan.

== Career ==
In 2016, Langan first appeared on television as a finalist on Season 2 of Spring Baking championship. He later was a winning contestant Cake Wars. Langan has since appeared as a judge on Christmas Cookie Challenge, Winner Cake All, Duff's Halloween Cake Off and Chopped Sweets.

In 2018 Langan got his own Food Network digital series, Dan Can Bake It. In the show, Langan receives a bakery box that contains a message and visual clues of his baking challenge of the week. Season 2 of Dan Can Bake It premiered in January 2019.

In 2019 Langan became part of the Food Network Kitchen app, appearing in several on-demand cooking classes. In December 2019 Langan made his first guest appearance on Good Morning America. In February 2020, Food Network announced that Langan would be a judge and mentor on Bakeaway Camp With Martha Stewart, which premiered on May 11, 2020.
