= Ron Ben-Israel =

Israeli-American pastry chef (born 1957)

- רון בן-ישראל
- Born: 1957 (age 68–69); Israel
- Occupations: Pastry chef, Host of Sweet Genius, Judge on Cake Wars

Ron Ben-Israel (Hebrew: רון בן-ישראל; born 1957) is an Israeli-American pastry chef. He is the executive chef and owner of Ron Ben-Israel Cakes in New York City. He is known for his wedding and special occasion cakes as well as for his detail in sugar paste flowers. From 2011 to 2013, he hosted the cooking competition TV show Sweet Genius. Ben-Israel has also been a judge on a variety of Food Network shows, including Cake Wars, Chopped, Guy's Grocery Games and Worst Cooks in America.

== Biography ==
Ron Ben-Israel was born in Israel. His mother was born in Vienna and was rescued from the ghetto by American volunteers, later immigrating to Israel. His father, Moshe, lost most of his family in the Holocaust, and survived Auschwitz. His father worked in the printing industry, while his mother worked in map-making for the government.

Ben-Israel grew up in Tel Aviv. He loved baking in the kitchen as a child. He attended the Thelma Yellin High School for the Arts, specializing in dance.

== Dancing career ==
Ben-Israel started a dance career at age 21, right after discharging from the army. He specialized in modern dance. He danced with the Israeli dance companies Batsheva and Bat-Dor over a period of some 15 years, and toured internationally. Near the end of his dancing career, he moved to the United States.

== Baking career ==
In 1993, while living in New York City, Ben-Israel retired from dancing, in part due to having developed arthritis. He started a new career in cooking, doing temporary jobs making cakes and designing shop windows. In 1996, he fell in love with baking. He was discovered and mentored by Betty Van Nostrand and Martha Stewart who saw one of his cakes in a window. He was disappointed by the American approach to baking (vegetable shortening, powder sugar, plastic columns, plastic figurines) and set to create more elegant and delicate cakes, digging into his Israeli background where the pastry culture was more international. He designed a cake for the very first issue of Martha Stewart Living Weddings (1995). He launched Ron Ben-Israel Cakes in 1999. He was tagged “the Manolo Blahnik of wedding cakes" in a 2003 issue of The New York Times.

His television appearances include Martha Stewart, the Bravo Network, The Oprah Winfrey Show, the Food Network, and the Late Show with David Letterman.

From 2011 to 2013, Ben-Israel was the host and judge of the Food Network competition show Sweet Genius.

Ben-Israel appeared as a guest judge on Season 2 of the Netflix Baking-parody show Nailed It!. He has also appeared as a guest judge on Season 3 of Netflix's Sugar Rush and on Food Network's The Big Bake.

== Private life ==
Ron Ben-Israel is gay, and is married to his husband Hiroyuki Aihara.
