= Sweet Genius =

2011 American reality TV series

- Genre: Reality
- Written by: Amanda Hulsey
- Presented by: Ron Ben-Israel
- Country of origin: United States
- Original language: English
- No. of seasons: 3
- No. of episodes: 34

Production
- Executive producers: Linda Lea; Donna MacLetchie
- Producer: Jessica Carbrera
- Production location: America
- Editors: Brian Gale; Daniel J. Moratti; Gregg Paine
- Camera setup: Multi-camera
- Running time: 41 to 43 minutes (excluding commercials)
- Production company: Jane Street Entertainment

Original release
- Network: Food Network
- Release: September 22, 2011 – January 24, 2013

Sweet Genius is an American reality-based cooking television series on the Food Network. The series is hosted by pastry chef Ron Ben-Israel. The premise of the show pits four chefs, of confectionery and pastry, against one another to compete for a chance to win $10,000 based on the creativity and taste of each dish. The first season premiered on September 22, 2011. Season two debuted on March 15, 2012. Season 3 premiered on October 18, 2012, ending on January 24, 2013.

== Format ==
Similar to the format of the show Chopped, four chefs compete in separate rounds with mandatory ingredients. After each round, a chef is eliminated from the competition. What differentiates it from Chopped is that they also must include an inspiration. In Season 1, the rounds were divided into challenges to create Frozen, Baked and Chocolate desserts and also an electronic voice told them their inspiration and ingredients for the round. Chef Ben-Israel had a much stricter personality in this season. In the following seasons, the format was changed to Chocolate, Candy and Cake and the electronic voice was taken out, while Chef Ben-Israel became far less strict and more cheery.

At the beginning of each round, Chef Ben-Israel reveals the first mandatory ingredient followed by an inspiration. The second mandatory ingredient is revealed at the halfway point of each round. On rare occasions, a third ingredient is introduced. The time limit goes from 40 minutes in the first round, 50 minutes in the second round, and then an hour in the final round. After each round, Chef Ben-Israel tastes and evaluates each dessert. The loser of the round is revealed when Chef Ben-Israel formally tells the contestant, "You were no sweet genius."

== Series overview ==
Season	Episodes	Premiere	Finale
1	8	September 22, 2011	November 3, 2011
2	13	March 15, 2012	June 7, 2012
3	13	October 18, 2012	January 24, 2013

== Episodes ==
- All episode titles ended with the word "Genius".

=== Season 1 (2011) ===
No.	Title	Original release date
1	"Dark Genius"	September 22, 2011
2	"Hard Boiled Genius"	September 25, 2011
3	"Hidden Genius"	September 29, 2011
4	"Candied Genius"	October 6, 2011
5	"Glistening Genius"	October 13, 2011
6	"Global Genius"	October 20, 2011
7	"Disco Genius"	October 27, 2011
8	"Fiery Genius"	November 3, 2011

=== Season 2 (2012) ===
No.	Title	Original release date
1	"Golden Genius"	March 15, 2012
2	"Dancing Genius"	March 22, 2012
3	"Magic Genius"	March 29, 2012
4	"Electrifying Genius"	April 5, 2012
5	"Puzzled Genius"	April 12, 2012
6	"Speechless Genius"	April 19, 2012
7	"Baby Genius"	April 26, 2012
8	"Relative Genius"	May 3, 2012
9	"Genie Genius"	May 10, 2012
10	"Serpentine Genius"	May 17, 2012
11	"Glowing Genius"	May 24, 2012
12	"Lofty Genius"	May 31, 2012
13	"Plane Genius"	June 7, 2012

=== Season 3 (2012-2013) ===
No.	Title	Original release date
1	"Cuckoo Genius"	October 18, 2012
2	"Halloween Genius"	October 25, 2012
3	"Ugly Genius"	November 1, 2012
4	"Wicked Genius"	November 8, 2012
5	"Turkey Genius"	November 15, 2012
6	"Squeaky Genius"	November 22, 2012
7	"Holiday Genius"	December 6, 2012
8	"Twinkling Genius"	December 13, 2012
9	"Dream Catching Genius"	December 20, 2012
10	"Electric Genius"	January 3, 2013
11	"Sci-Fi Genius"	January 10, 2013
12	"Samba Genius"	January 17, 2013
13	"Wedded Genius"	January 24, 2013
