= Los Angeles Zoo =

Zoo and botanical garden in Los Angeles, California, US

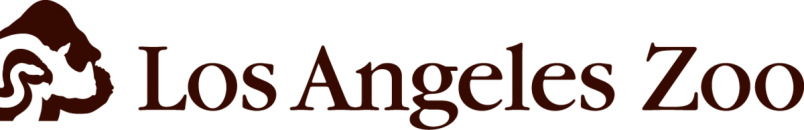

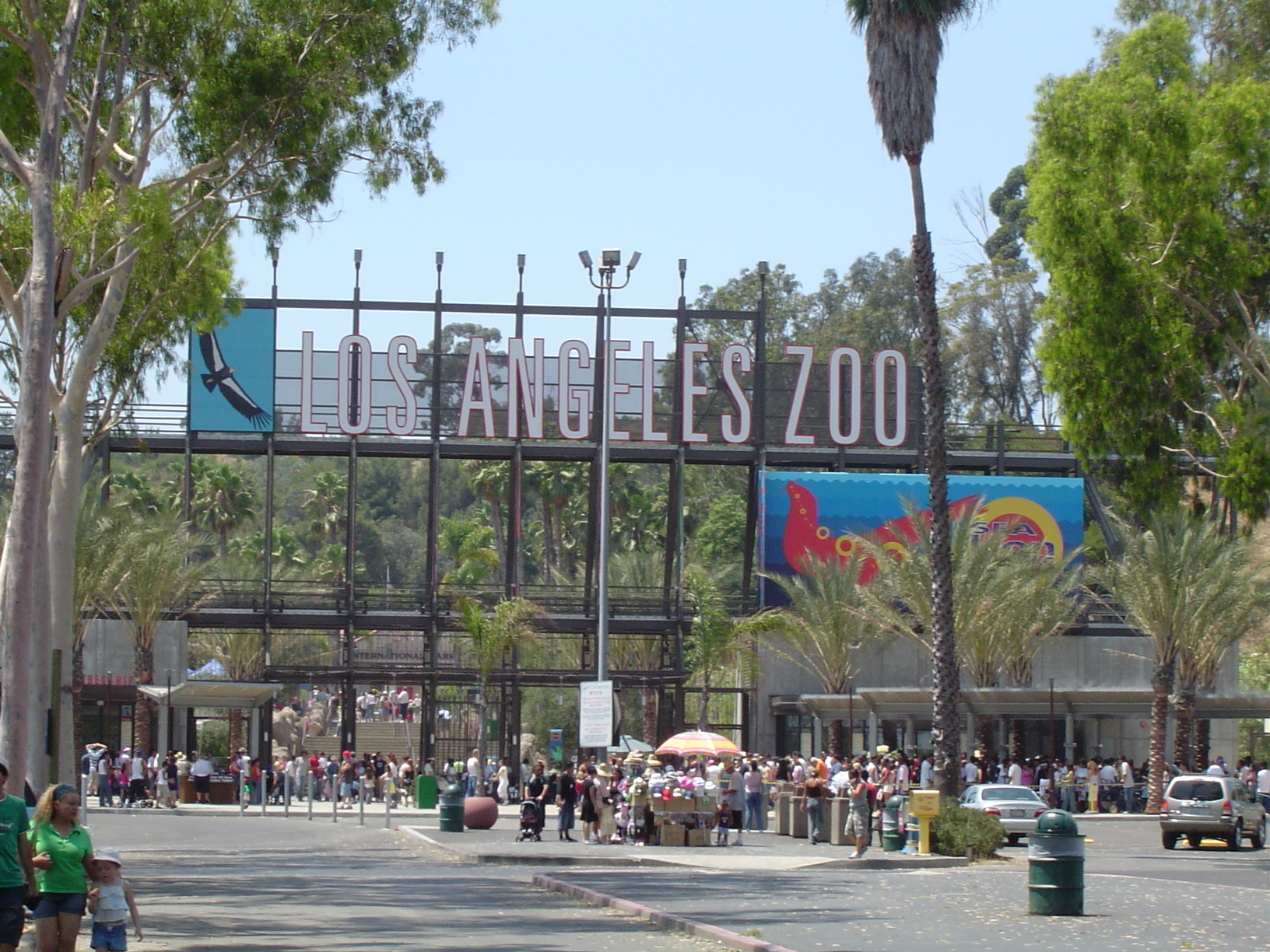
- Main entrance, c. 2005.
- Interactive map of Los Angeles Zoo
- 34.148146°N 118.28388°W
- Date opened: November 28, 1966; 59 years ago
- Location: Los Angeles, California, United States
- Land area: 133 acres (54 ha)
- No. of animals: 1,400
- No. of species: 270+
- Annual visitors: Nearly 1.8 million
- Memberships: AZA, WAZA
- Major exhibits: Campo Gorilla Reserve, Chimpanzees of the Mahale Mountains, Red Ape Rainforest, Sea Life Cliffs, Elephants of Asia, The LAIR
- Website: www.lazoo.org

The Los Angeles Zoo and Botanical Gardens is a 133-acre (54 ha) zoo founded in 1966 and located in Los Angeles, California, United States. The city of Los Angeles owns the zoo, its land and facilities, and the animals.

== History ==
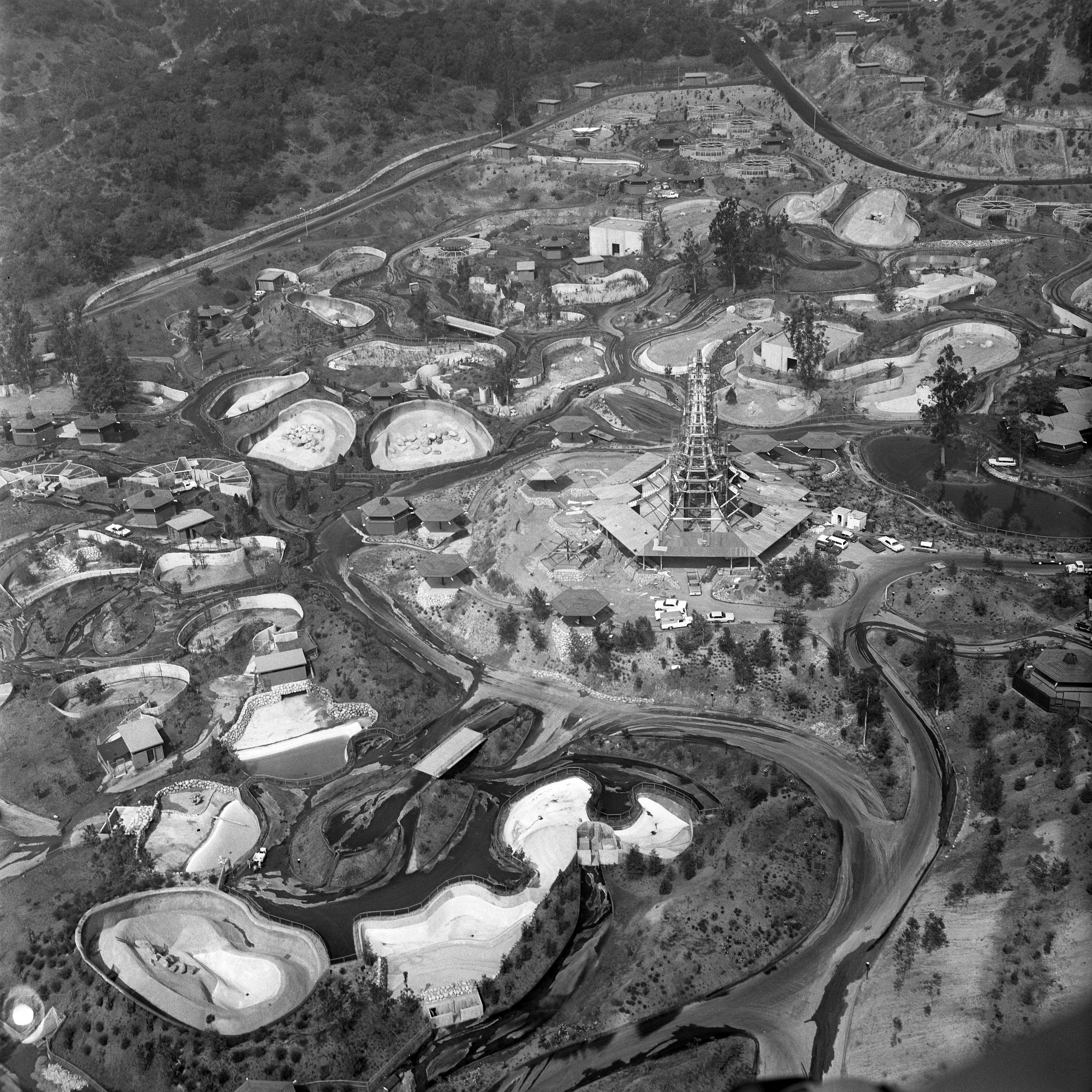
Aerial view of construction of the Los Angeles Zoo.

Eastlake Zoo, opened in Eastlake Park (renamed Lincoln Park in 1917) in 1885. The second zoo, Griffith Park Zoo, opened in 1912 and was located about two miles (3.2 km) south of the current zoo site until it was closed in August 1966. Remnants of the original zoo remain. The Los Angeles Zoo opened in its present location on November 28, 1966. The site was formerly the location of Rodger Young Village, which was itself built on the land which had been used for the Griffith Park Aerodrome.

By the early 1990s, the zoo's infrastructure was deteriorating. In January 1992, a ten-inch water pipe burst, leaving half of the zoo without water. The next day, city officials passed a $300 million master plan that had been recently drafted to deal with the infrastructure problems and inadequate exhibits. The zoo nearly lost its accreditation in 1995 because of numerous health and safety violation; it rebounded under a new director. The number of species exhibited has been reduced from 400 in 1993 to around 280, coinciding with construction of larger naturalistic enclosures holding animals in bigger groups.

In 1998, the zoo opened Chimpanzees of the Mahale Mountains, followed by Red Ape RainForest in 2000, the Komodo Dragon Exhibit, the Winnick Family Children Zoo in 2001, the Entry Plaza, Children's Discovery Center and Sea Lion Cliffs (now Sea Life Cliffs) in 2005, Campo Gorilla Reserve in November 2007, Elephants of Asia in the winter of 2010, and the LAIR (Living Amphibians, Invertebrates, and Reptiles) in 2012.

=== Animal incidents ===
In 1979, Virginia, a wolf, escaped the zoo multiple times by ascending trees, climbing fences, and walking along branches until she could escape. At one time she eluded capture for a month by hiding in Griffith Park. It is unclear whether Virginia was ever recaptured. In 1987, 47 flamingos were killed by coyotes which had snuck into the park. The flamingo pen was accidentally left unlocked, allowing the coyotes to get the birds.

A spate of escapes took place during the late 1990s and early 2000s when, in half a decade, at least 35 animals escaped the zoo including zebras, chimpanzees, kangaroos and antelopes. Evelyn, the gorilla, escaped her enclosure approximately five times. In one widely covered incident, she used some overgrown vines to pull herself out of her exhibit. She then had full run of the zoo for an hour as TV-news copters hovered overhead and visitors were evacuated before she was tranquilized. In a prior incident, she hopped on the back of another gorilla, Jim, to make her escape (Jim had also previously escaped). Part of the problem was that the gorilla habitat was originally intended to house bears; this was alleviated by the opening of a specially designed Campo Gorilla Reserve in 2007.

On June 26, 2012, a chimpanzee infant baby, born to Gracie, a member of a 15-chimpanzee tribe (one of the largest chimpanzee tribes of any North American zoo), was mauled to death by an adult male chimpanzee. The zoo said this event was totally unexpected, although it also stated that acts of aggression by male chimpanzees (toward humans, or toward a rival male chimpanzee over territory or a desired female) are always a possibility. Gracie was allowed to keep her baby overnight to grieve, and counseling was being offered to staff (none had witnessed the event), and to the visitors who had seen the event. It is reexamining its policy of how it introduces baby chimpanzees to the tribe.

In 2014, a bighorn sheep escaped from its enclosure, and ultimately the zoo itself. It was struck by a car approximately three hours later and subsequently died. In 2016, Killarney the koala was killed by P-22, the cougar that lived in Griffith Park.

=== 2028 Summer Olympics and Paralympics ===
During the 2028 Summer Olympics, the road cycling time trials will start at the LA Zoo. At the 2028 Summer Paralympics, the LA Zoo will serve as the starting and finishing point for Para road cycling events.

== Management ==
The city of Los Angeles owns the zoo, its land and facilities, and the animals. Animal care, grounds maintenance, construction, education, public information, and administrative staff are city employees. The zoo was part of the parks and recreation department from 1966 until 1997, when it was reorganized as a department reporting directly to the city council.

The Greater Los Angeles Zoo Association (GLAZA) was created in 1963 and is a nonprofit corporation created to support the Los Angeles Zoo. GLAZA's primary responsibility is to seek and provide financial support for the zoo's programs and capital projects. GLAZA had a less formal arrangement with the zoo until 1980 when it acquired the right to run concessions directly inside of the zoo. This lasted until 2025, when GLAZA declined to bid for concessions or other direct zoo program management.

As of June 2019, Denise M. Verret serves as the zoo's director, the first female African American director of an Association of Zoos and Aquariums-accredited institution.

== Exhibits and attractions ==
=== Botanical Gardens ===
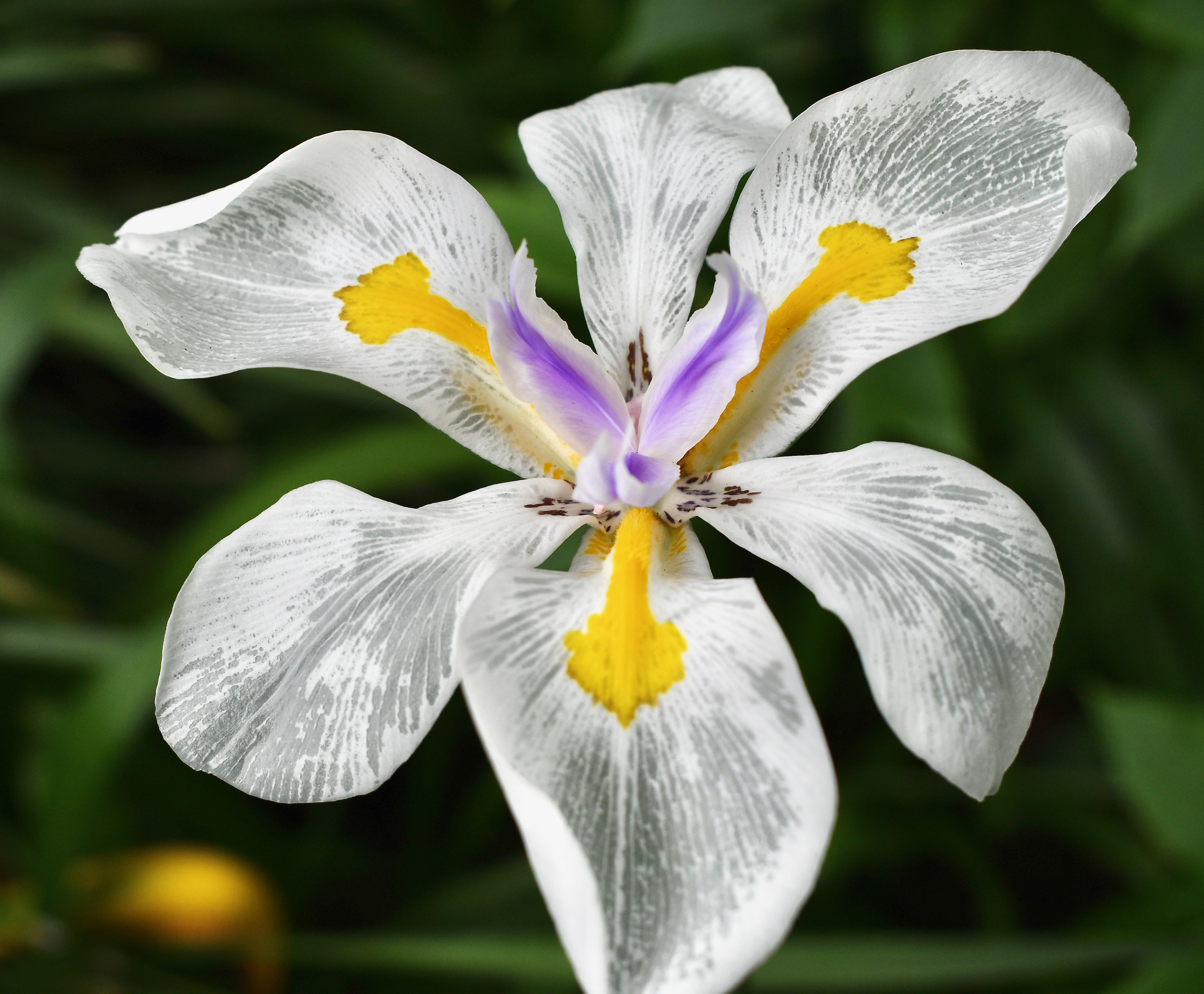
White and Gray Iris flower, just one of the many plants in the garden areas.

In 2002, the zoo received certification as a botanical garden and was renamed the Los Angeles Zoo and Botanical Gardens. Its grounds contain 15 plant collections representing more than 800 species and comprising over 7,400 individual plants.

=== Chimpanzees of Mahale Mountains ===
A one-acre (0.4-ha) exhibit complex that opened in 1998, houses chimpanzees in a landscaped hillside habitat. The exhibit features boulders, palm trees, an artificial termite mound, and a waterfall beside a tall rock ledge from which the troop's leader can survey the enclosure. Visitors can observe the chimpanzees across several moats or through a glass viewing window.

=== Campo Gorilla Reserve ===
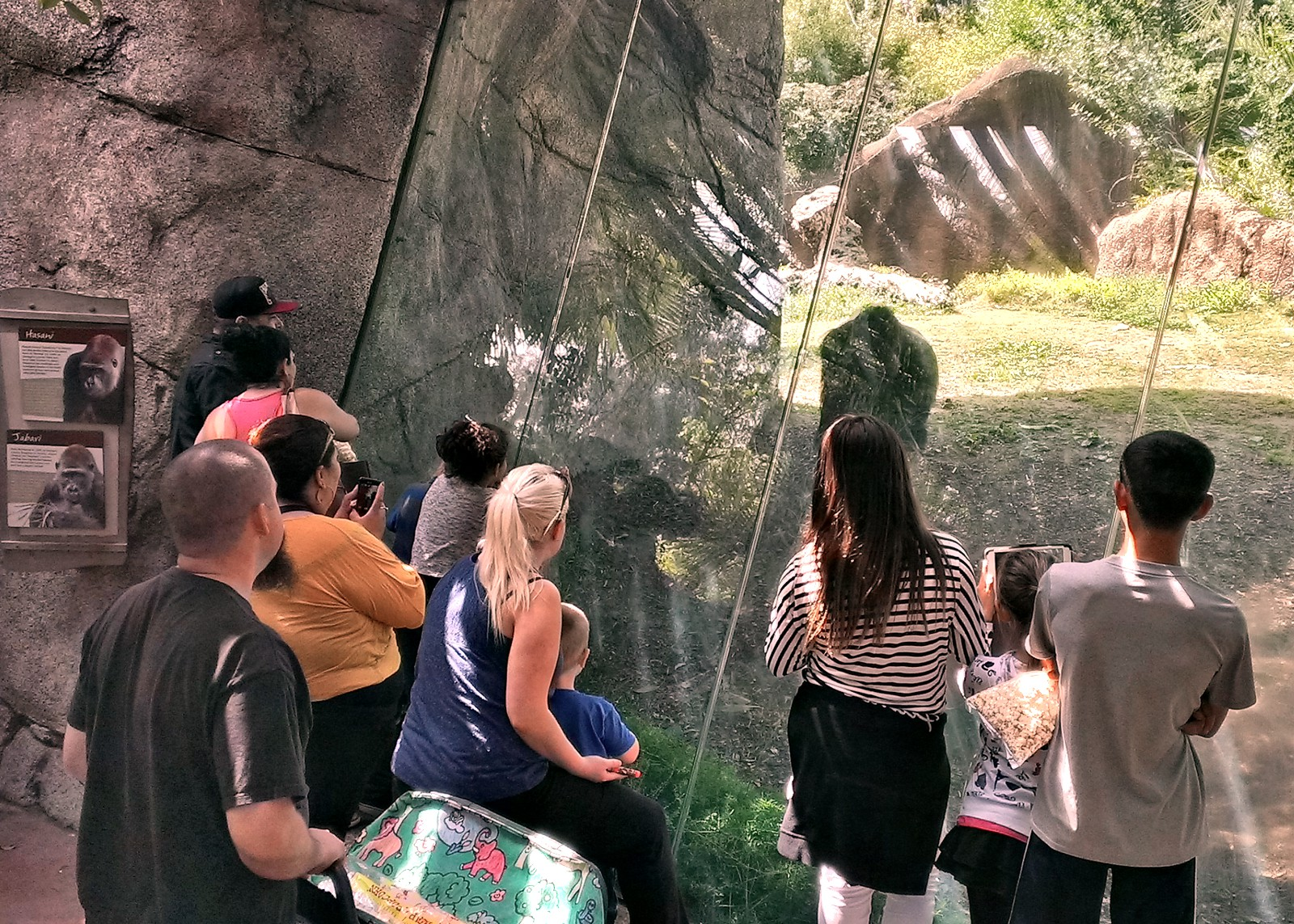
One of several viewing locations within the Campo Gorilla Reserve

Campo Gorilla Reserve opened in November 2007 and houses western lowland gorillas in a 1.5-acre (0.61 ha) exhibit. Visitors can observe the animals through two glass viewing windows and from three additional viewing areas. The exhibit contains palms, pomegranates, and ferns. On January 18, 2020, an endangered western lowland gorilla was born at the Los Angeles Zoo, marking the first birth of the species there in more than two decades.

=== The LAIR ===
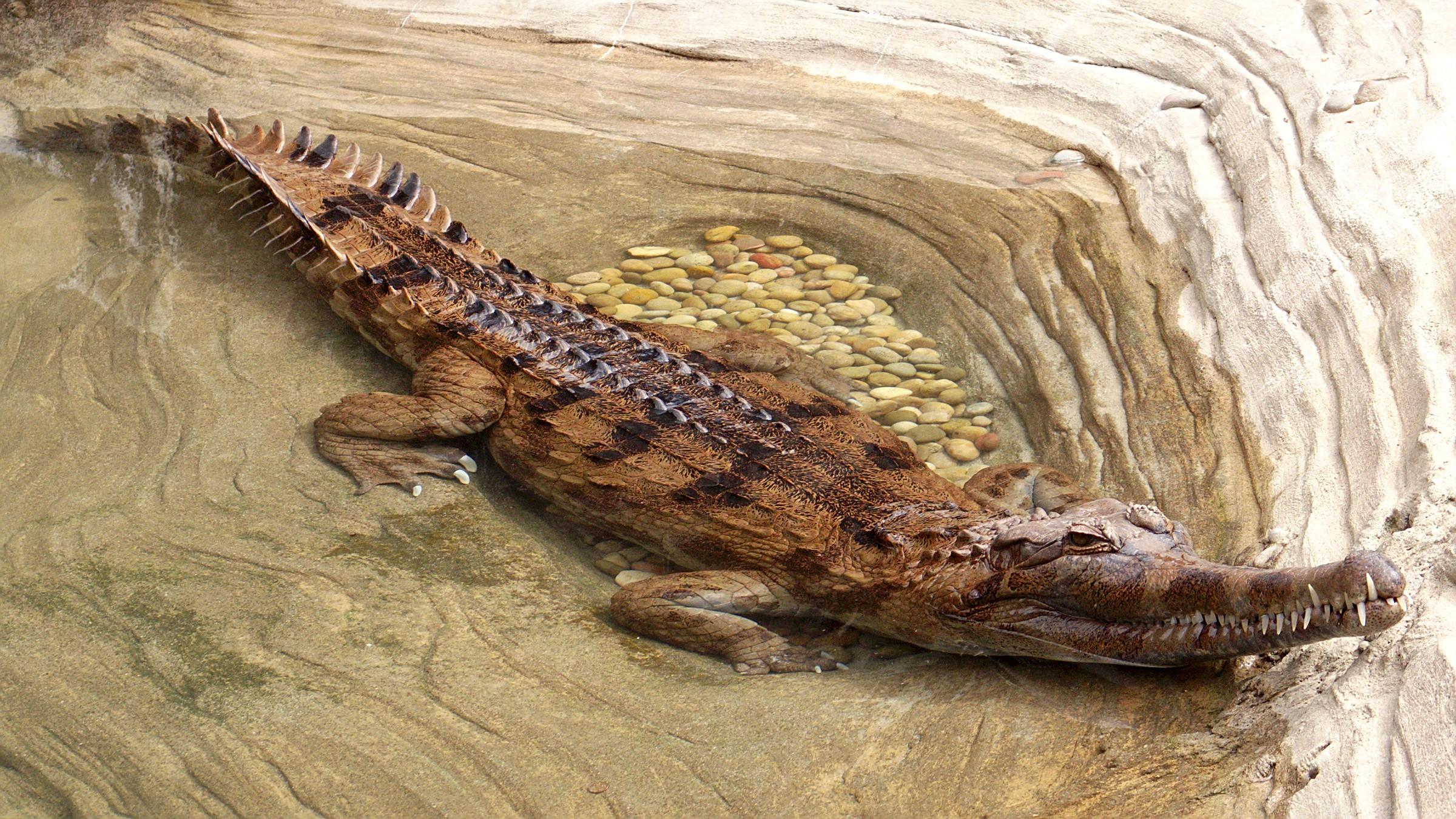
False gharial (Tomistoma schlegelii)

The LAIR (Living Amphibians, Invertebrates, and Reptiles), which opened in 2012, is a $14 million indoor-outdoor exhibit complex that focuses on herps and terrestrial arthropods. Guests first pass through the Oak Woodland Pond, where local species can move in and live among native plants. The next feature is the 6,000-square-foot (560 m^{2}) main building where the Damp Forest houses poison dart frogs, Chinese giant salamanders, and a recreation of a Daintree Rainforest river with archerfish, Australian lungfish, and Fly River turtles. The Mangshan pitviper, west African green mamba, South American bushmaster and other snakes live in the next segment of the building, Betty's Bite and Squeeze Room, named after Greater Los Angeles Zoo Association co-chair Betty White.

Guests can see keepers care for animals behind the scenes in the Behind the Glass room. The Care and Conservation Room showcases Gray's monitor and other endangered reptiles. After the main building is Arroyo Lagarto, a set of outdoor exhibits for Madagascar radiated tortoise, Madagascar spider tortoise, desert lizards, and California desert tortoise. A 2,000-square-foot (190 m^{2}) secondary building, the Desert LAIR, houses the Gila monster, Sonoran toad, Arizona Desert hairy scorpion, California kingsnake, and other species from Mexico, Arizona, and Southern California. The LAIR ends with Crocodile Swamp, an outdoor exhibit home to false gharials.

=== Red Ape Rain Forest ===
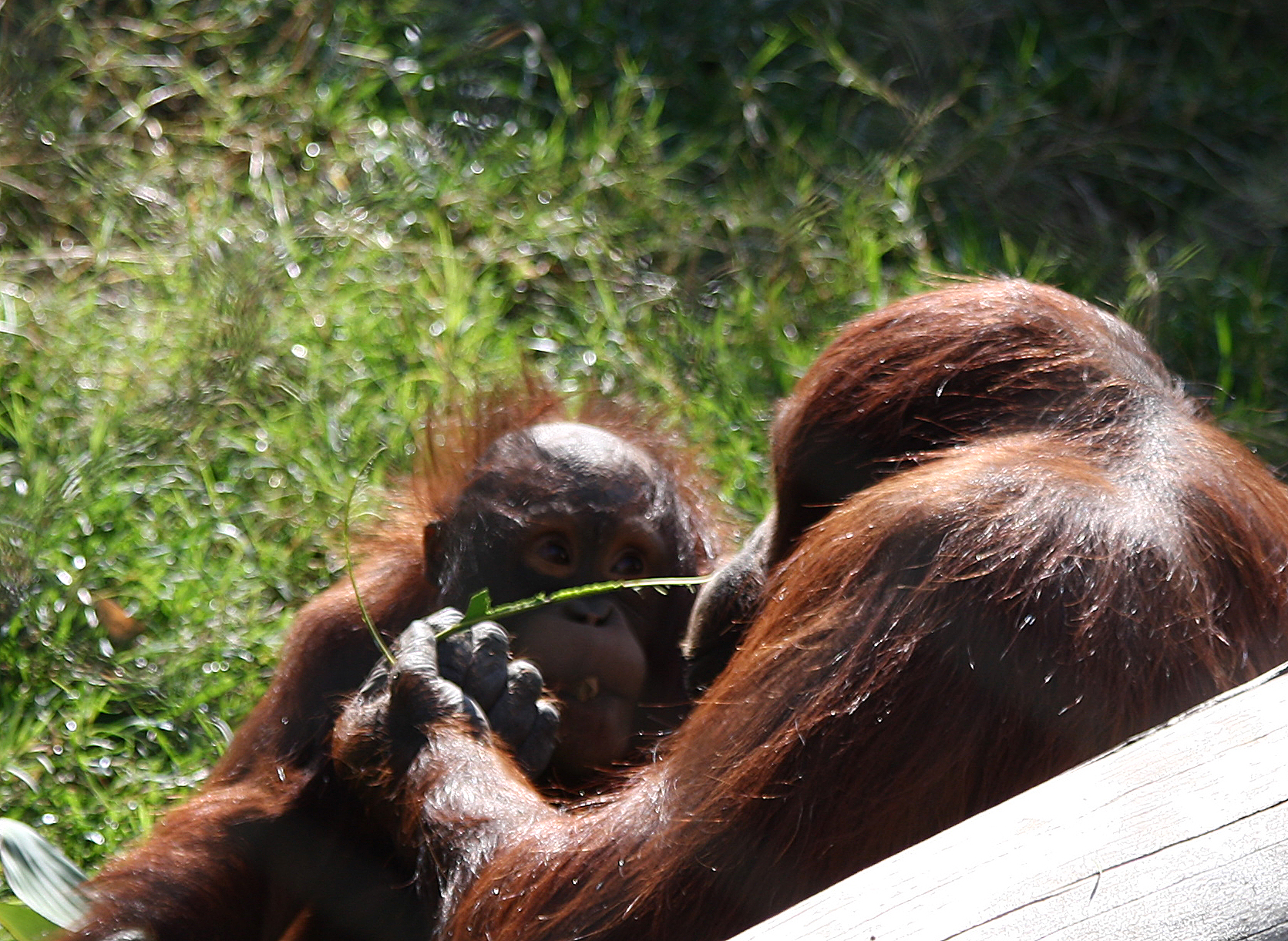
Orangutan and baby orangutan.

A recreation of a Southeast Asian jungle, opened in 2000 and houses Bornean orangutans. The 6,000 sq ft (560 m^{2}) mesh enclosure is shaped like a horizontal torus, with openings that allow visitor pathways to pass through it. The exhibit is landscaped with hibiscus, bamboo, and rubber trees. The orangutans can climb artificial sway poles, branches, and vines or wade through a shallow stream.

Visitors enter the exhibit through an Indonesian-style pagoda, and cross a stream via a deck bridge before reaching a small pavilion with a glass viewing window. The path continues to a central viewing deck overlooking the enclosure, followed by an interpretive area featuring traditional Indonesian folklore. Visitors exit the exhibit through a second pagoda.

=== Rainforest of the Americas ===
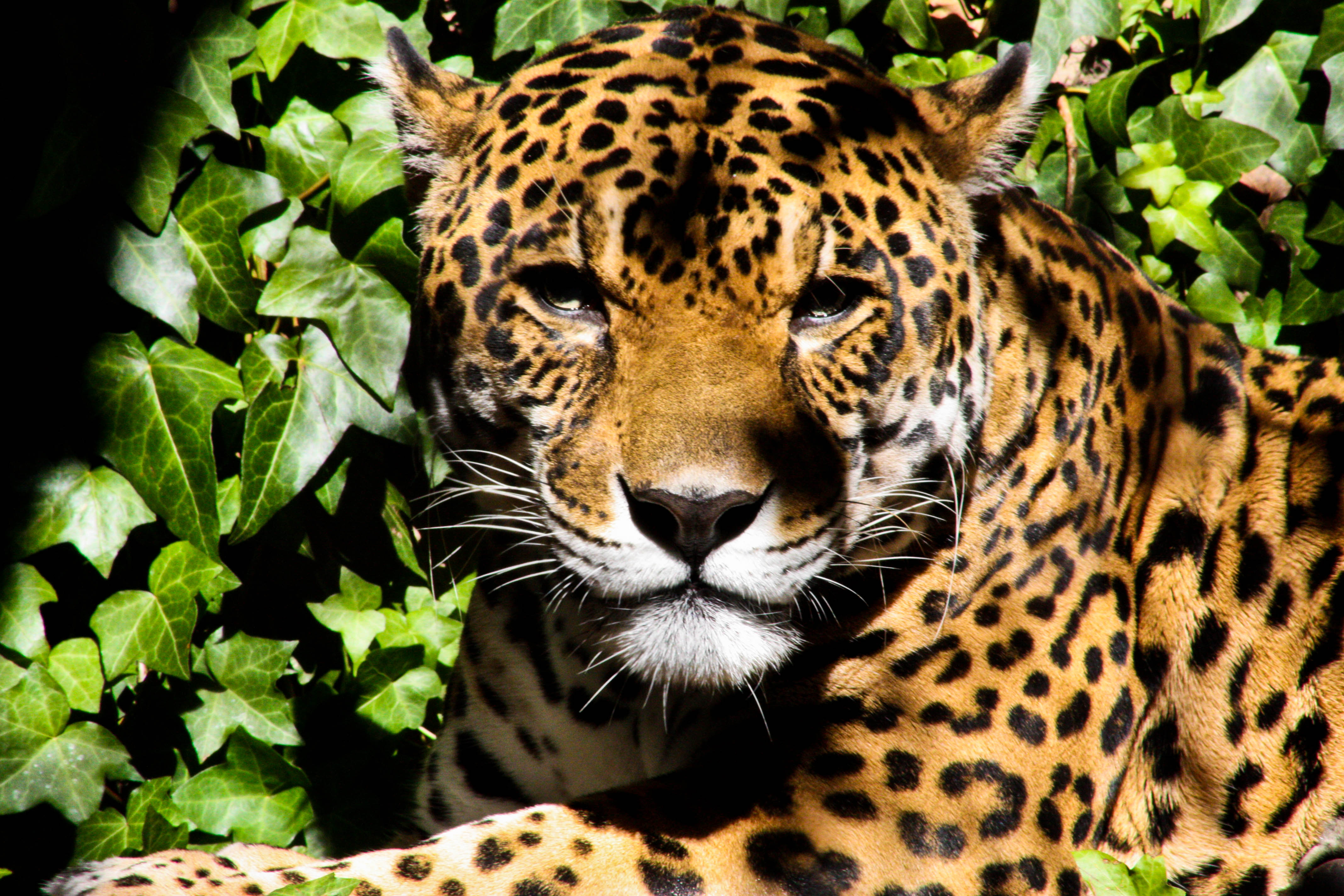
A jaguar resting in a natural habitat.

Rainforest of the Americas features animals who live in the tropical regions of North, Central, and South America. It opened in 2014 and houses the uakari, southern black howler monkey, red-bellied piranha, keel-billed toucan, harpy eagle, Goliath bird-eating spider, giant river otter, emerald tree boa, cotton-top tamarin, Baird's tapir, jaguar and other species.

=== Elephants of Asia ===
Not to be confused with Singapore Zoo's Elephants of Asia, this $42 million exhibit complex at the center of the zoo opened in 2010 and is currently an empty exhibit. There currently are no elephants at the Los Angeles Zoo. The two remaining Asian elephants, Billy and Tina, were transferred on May 21, 2025 to the Tulsa, Oklahoma Zoo. The main elephant enclosure was 3.8 acres (1.5 ha) and has a 16,000-square-foot (1,500 m^{2}) barn used for medical exams. The complex was divided into several areas, each based on a different country in the elephants' range. The Thai Pavilion teaches visitors about the role of elephant labor in Thailand's economy. Guests could find information about elephant conservation in India at Elephants of India Plaza, which also has a waterfall where the animals can bathe. The Elephants of China section houses sarus crane and Chinese water deer in a marsh habitat and had information about the history of the Dai people and their relationship with elephants. In April 2025, it was announced that the zoo would be transferring their last two remaining elephants Billy and Tina to the Tulsa Zoo and would be "pausing their elephant care" indefinitely, and the elephants would be transferred out a month later.

== Shows and activities ==
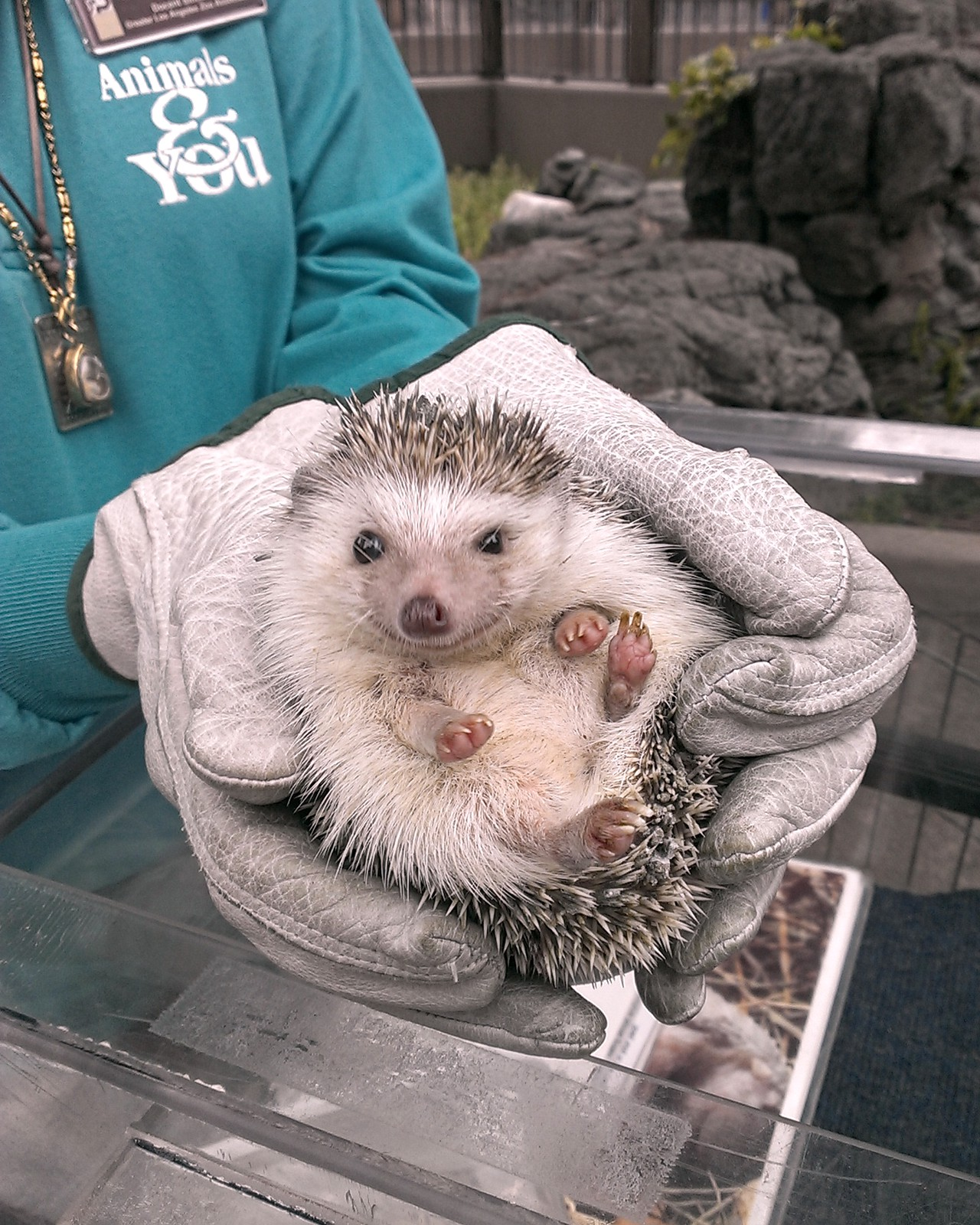
Daphne the hedgehog, part of the Animals & You Program

California Condor Rescue Zone (CCRZ): The CCRZ is a play space designed for children ages 6 and up, where they can learn how California condors are protected. The area also features live webcam feeds of the California Condors, which are not currently exhibited because of the sensitive nature of the rescue work.

World of Birds Show: Birds of prey and other endangered birds perform. Show times: 11:30am and 3:30pm, daily, except Tuesdays. The World of Birds Show is currently running but the birds are still in training.

Animals & You Program: These 15-minute-long animal presentations take place at stations in the Winnick Family Children's Zoo.

Winnick Family Children's Zoo: Located at the top of Winnick Family Children's Zoo, this petting zoo enables visitors to pet goats and sheep in an animal contact area known as Muriel's Ranch. Brushes are available at Muriel's Ranch for visitors to groom the domestic animals.

Neil Papiano Play Park: The Neil Papiano Play Park (located in the upper zoo along the perimeter road) incorporates animal-themed climbing sculptures, large play structures, a toddler area, water misters, grassy landscaping, and a large picnic area. It was designed to be accessible to all children visiting the zoo, including those with medical and physical challenges.

== Gottlieb Animal Health and Conservation Center ==
After a short rehabilitative stay at the zoo, a California condor is released back into the wild. (Video)

Named after philanthropists Robert and Suzanne Gottlieb, the Gottlieb Animal Health and Conservation Center is a 33,589-square-foot (3,100 m^{2}) facility situated in a restricted area in the upper reaches of the zoo. Among other features, it includes a state-of-the-art intensive care unit, an on-site commissary, a surgical suite with observation area, and research facilities. In 2007 the facility handled 853 medical cases. The smallest patient treated was a spider tortoise (0.08 kg) and the largest was an Asian elephant (4,826 kg).

=== Conservation work ===
The Los Angeles Zoo claims it has been successful in its breeding program of the rare California condor, helping to grow the number of condors in the world from a low of 22 in the 1980s to over 430 today. It is one of the few zoos worldwide to have the mountain tapir, and is the only zoo outside of Peru and Brazil to house the red uakari. It was one of the first zoos to successfully breed echidnas and gave birth to the first Coquerel's sifaka outside of Madagascar, the sifaka's native homeland.

== Magnet Center ==
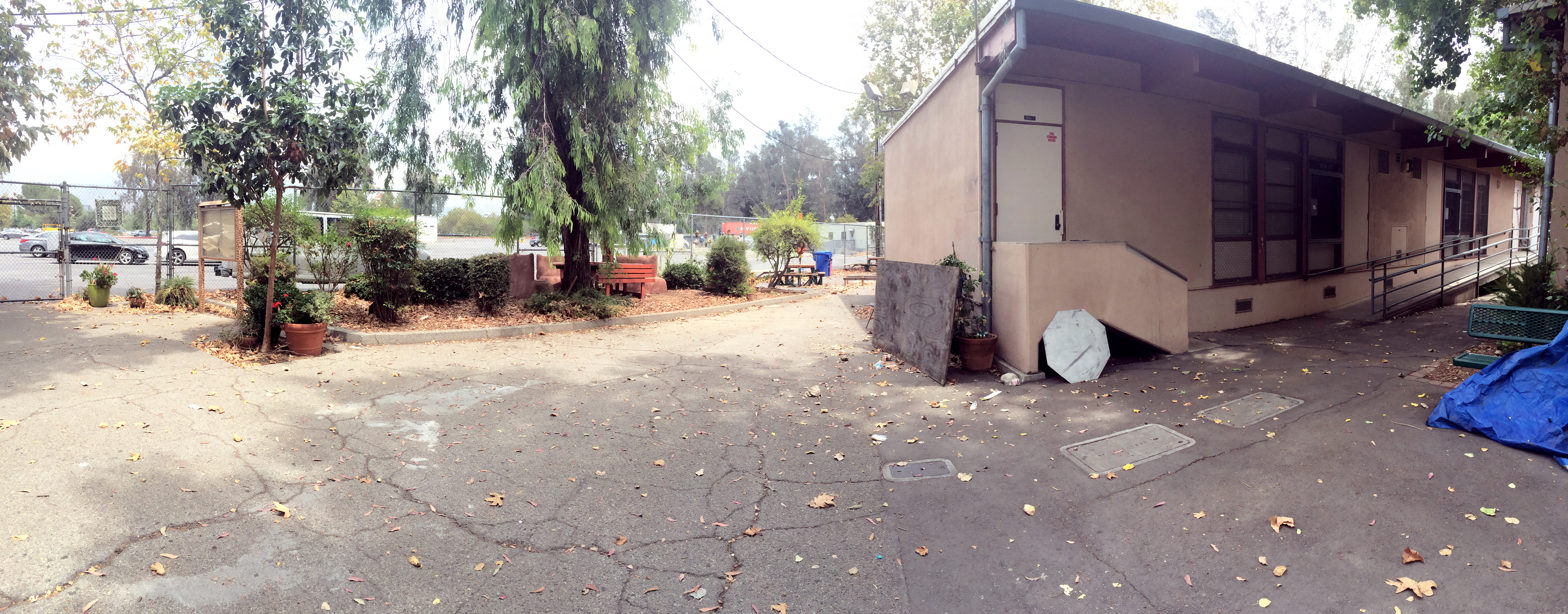
Magnet Center Campus

The North Hollywood High School Zoo Magnet Center is located across the street from the Los Angeles Zoo and Botanical Gardens in Griffith Park. The program was established in 1981 in the hopes of "a vision of providing a racially, ethnically, economically, and geographically diverse group of motivated students an enriched curriculum in animal and biological sciences." The Zoo Magnet Center offers 300 Los Angeles high school students a college preparatory curriculum focused on animal studies and biological sciences. It is also run by the Los Angeles Unified School District.

== Gallery ==
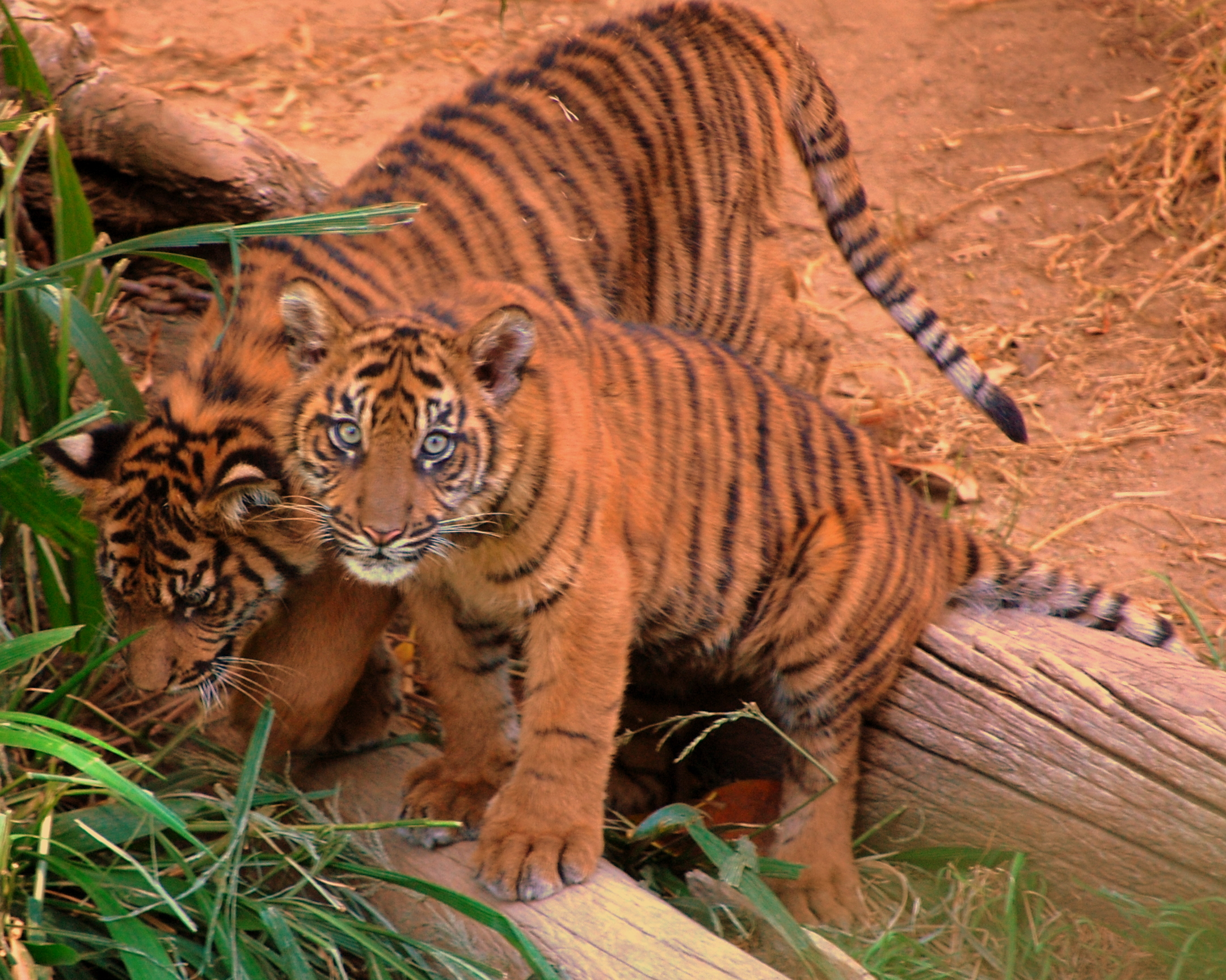
Tiger cubs

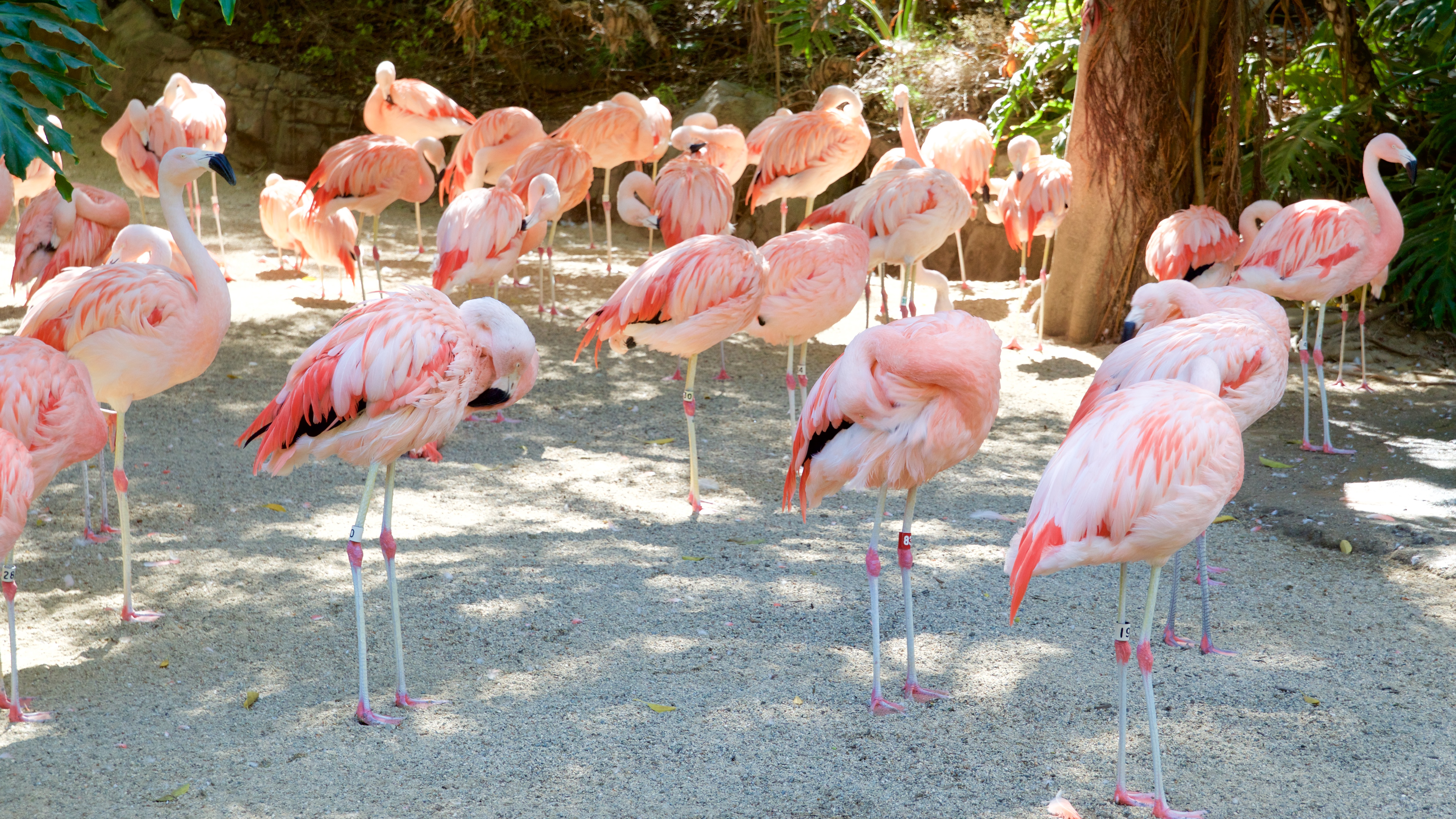
Flamingos

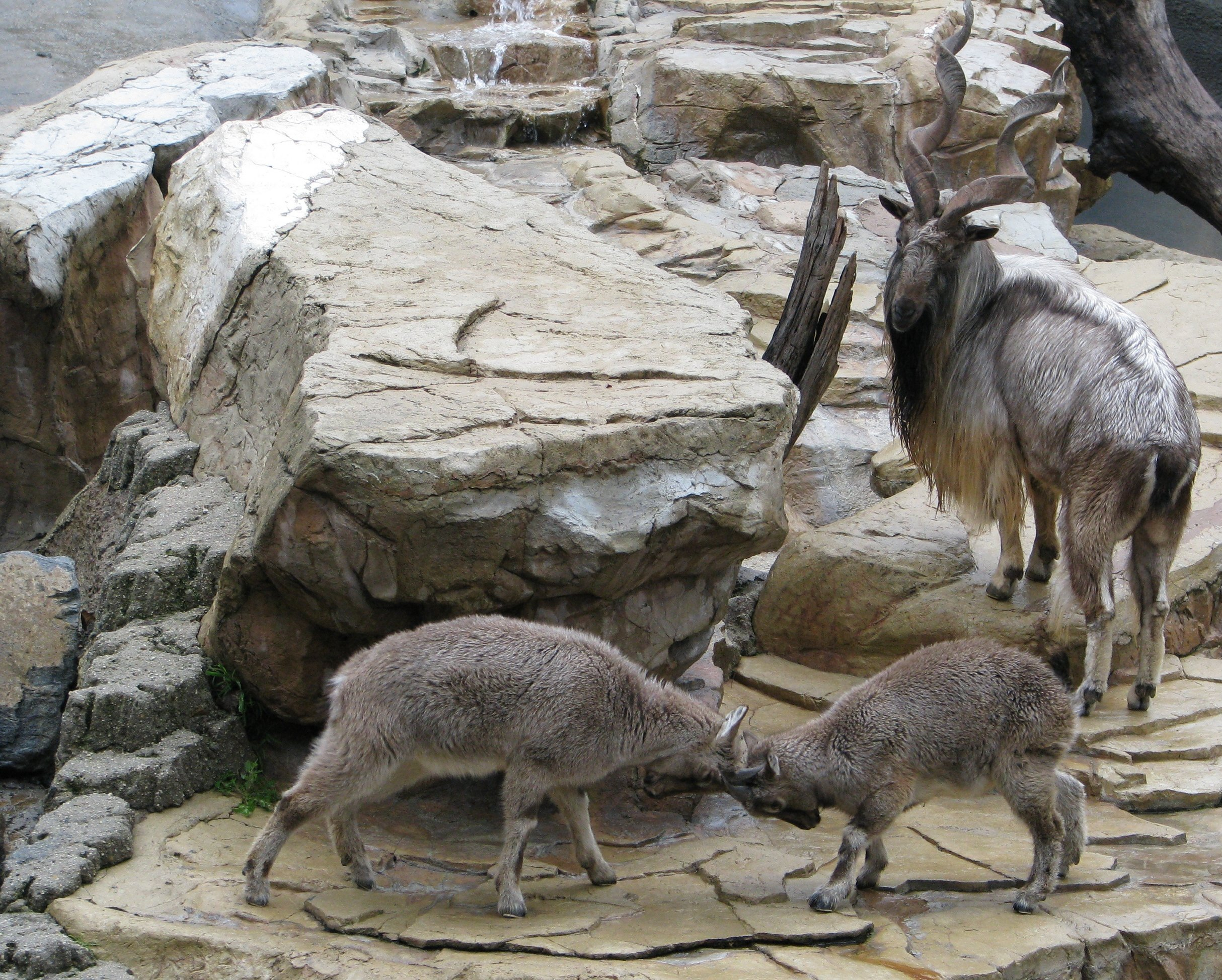
Markhor (Capra falconeri) with young.

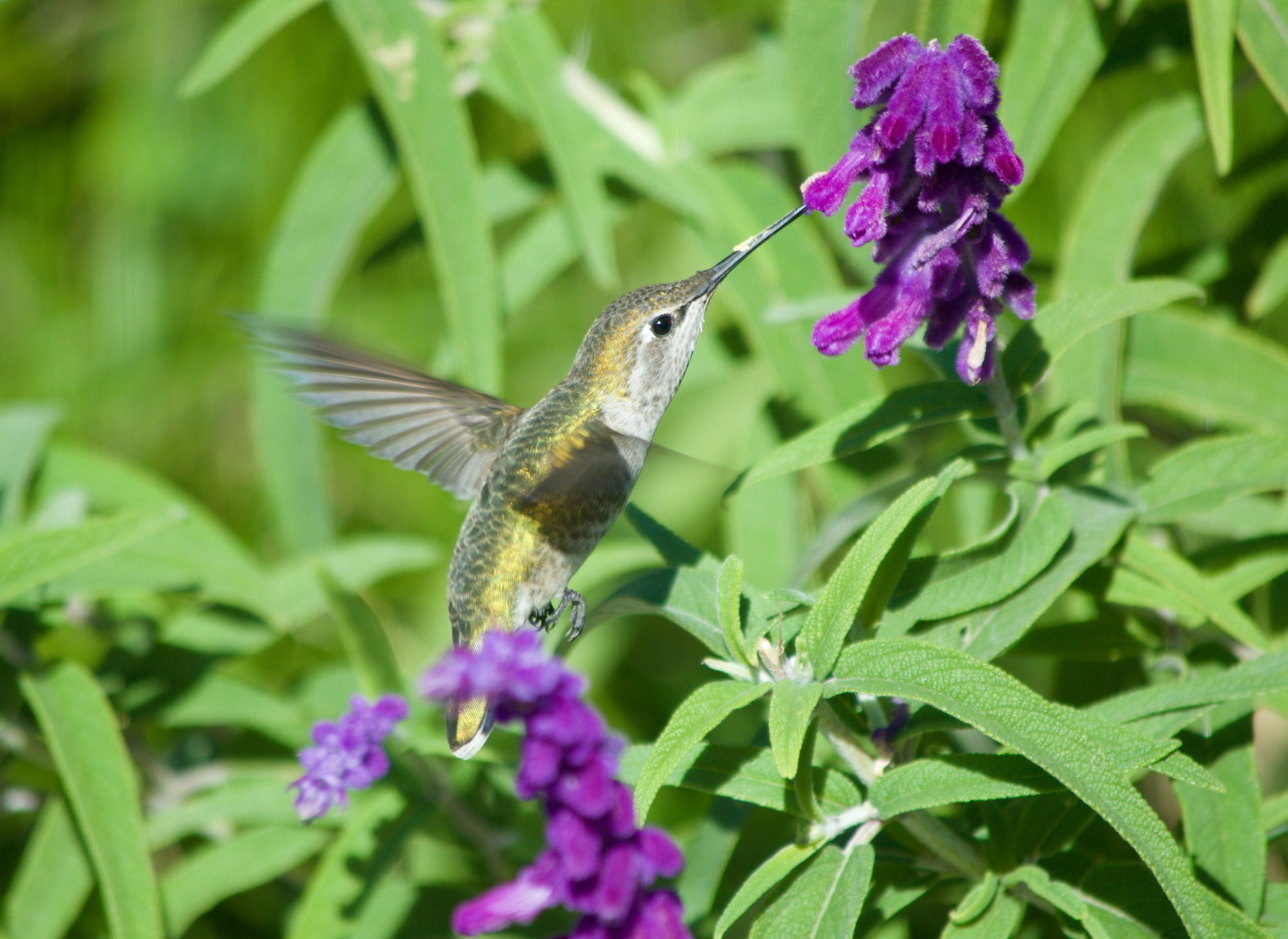
Hummingbird

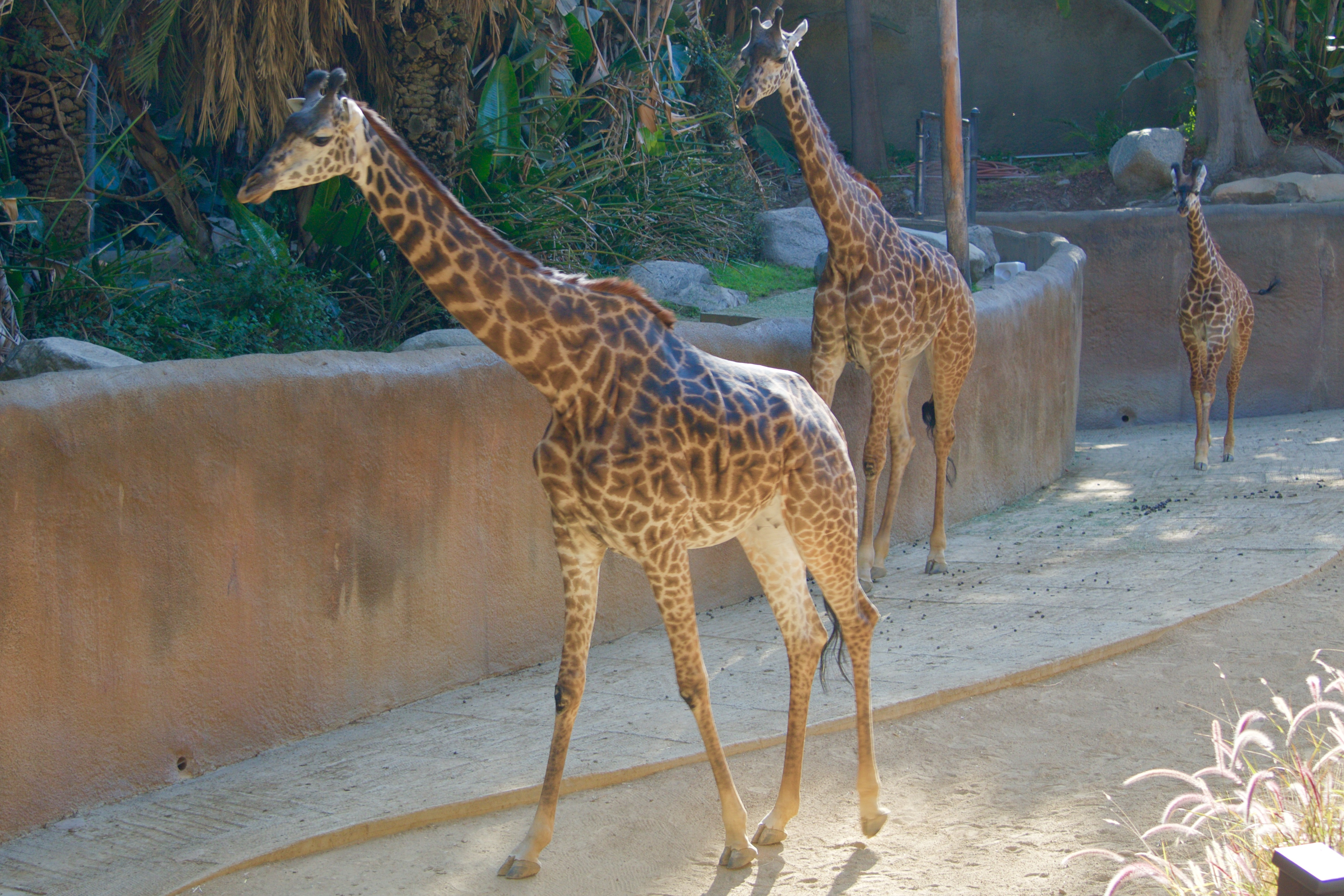
Giraffes

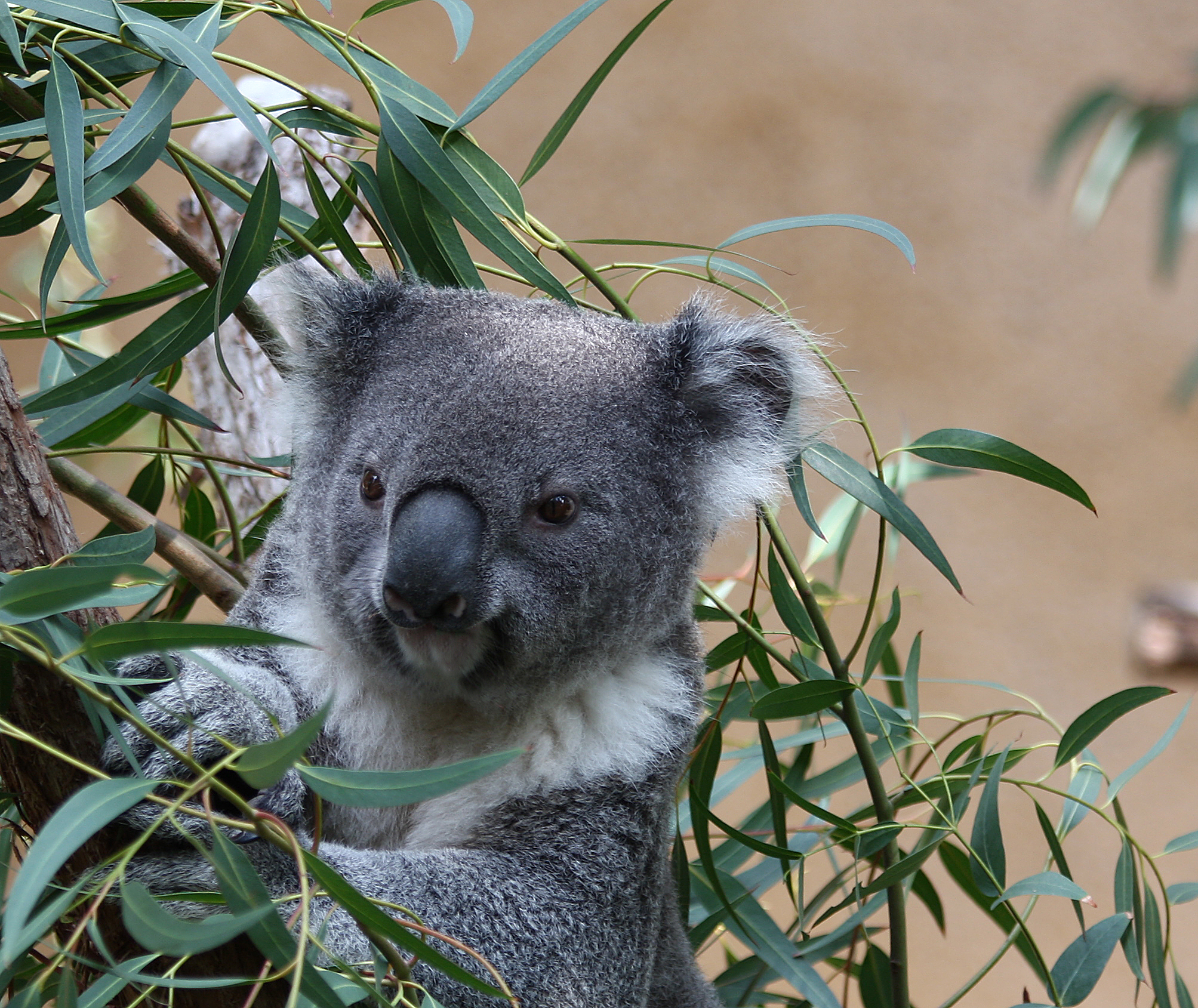
Koala

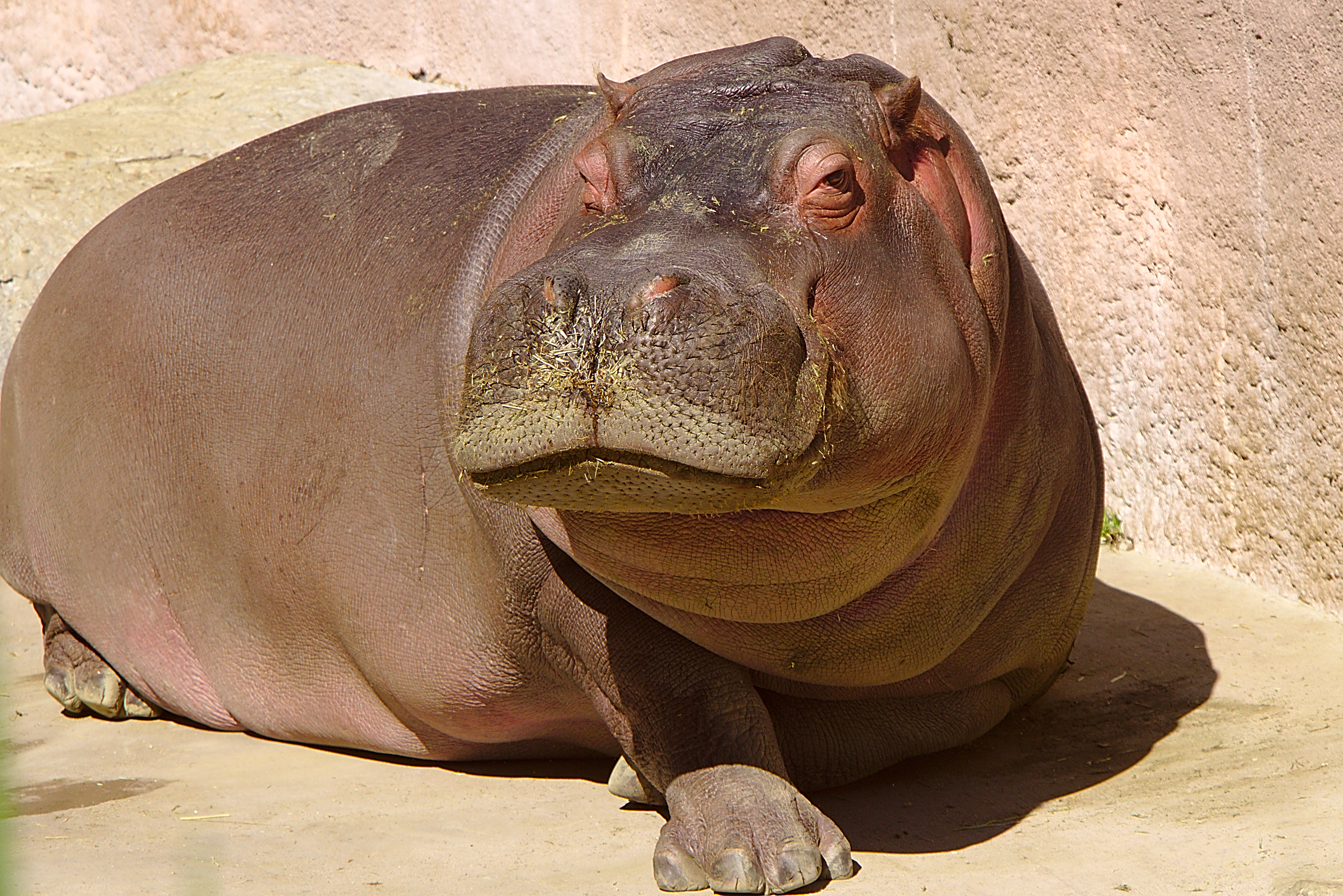
Hippopotamus

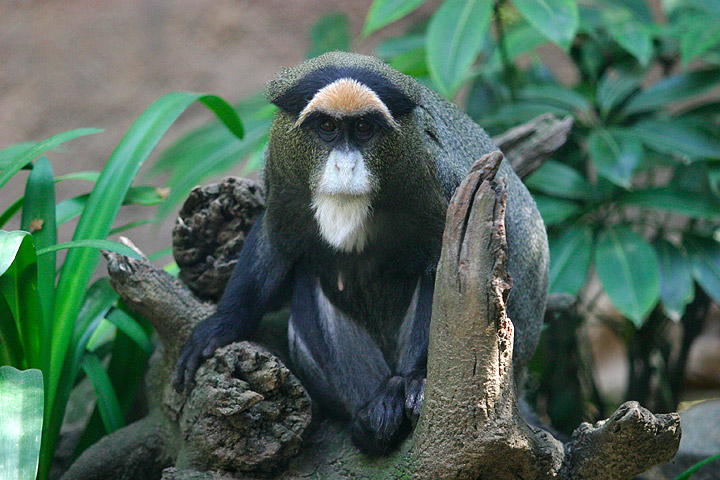
De Brazza's monkey (Cercopithecus neglectus)

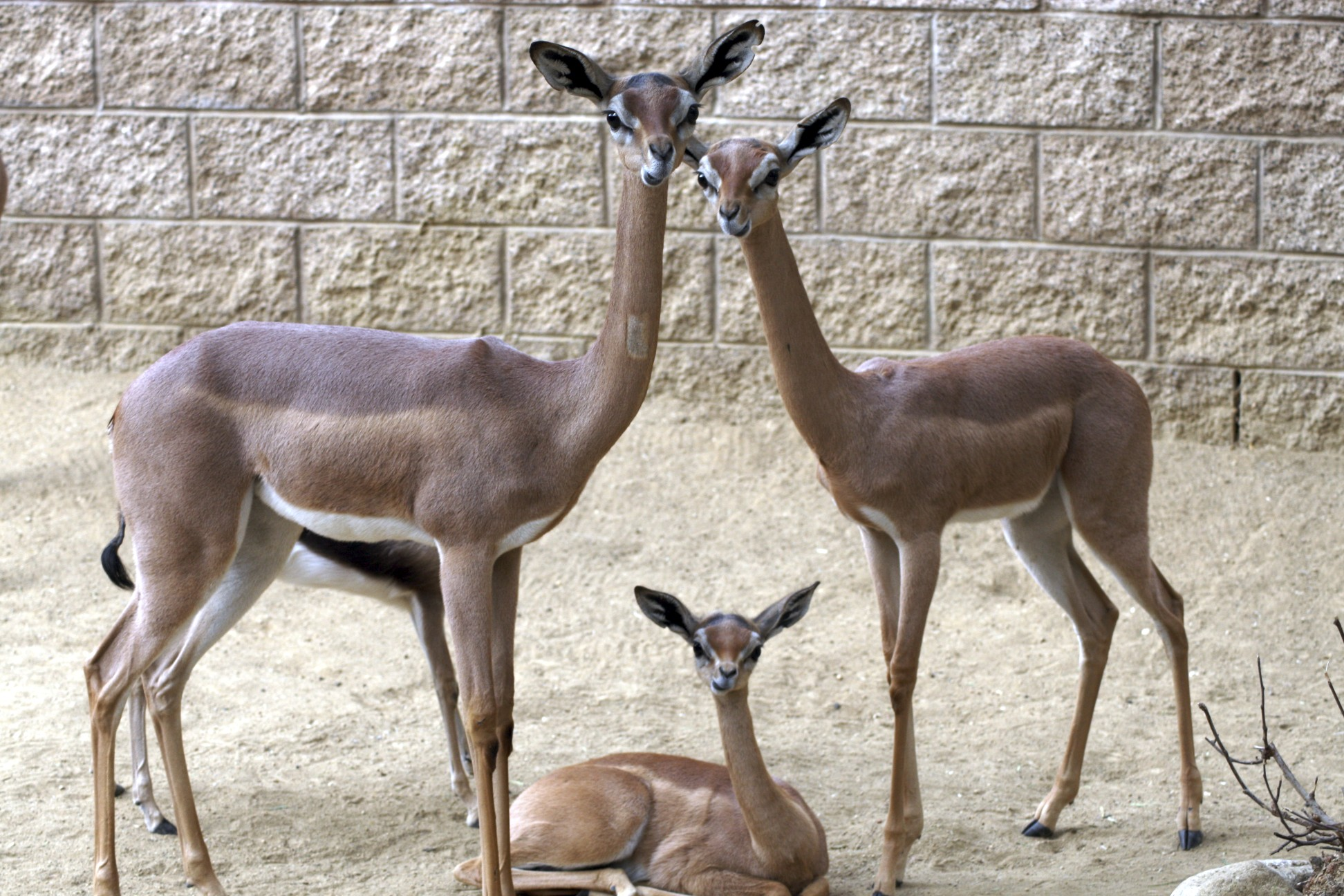
Gerenuk (Litocranius walleri)

== See also ==
- John C. Holland, Los Angeles City Council member, 1943–67, opposed turning the zoo over to a private organization
