= Aquarium of the Pacific =

Public aquarium in Long Beach, California, United States

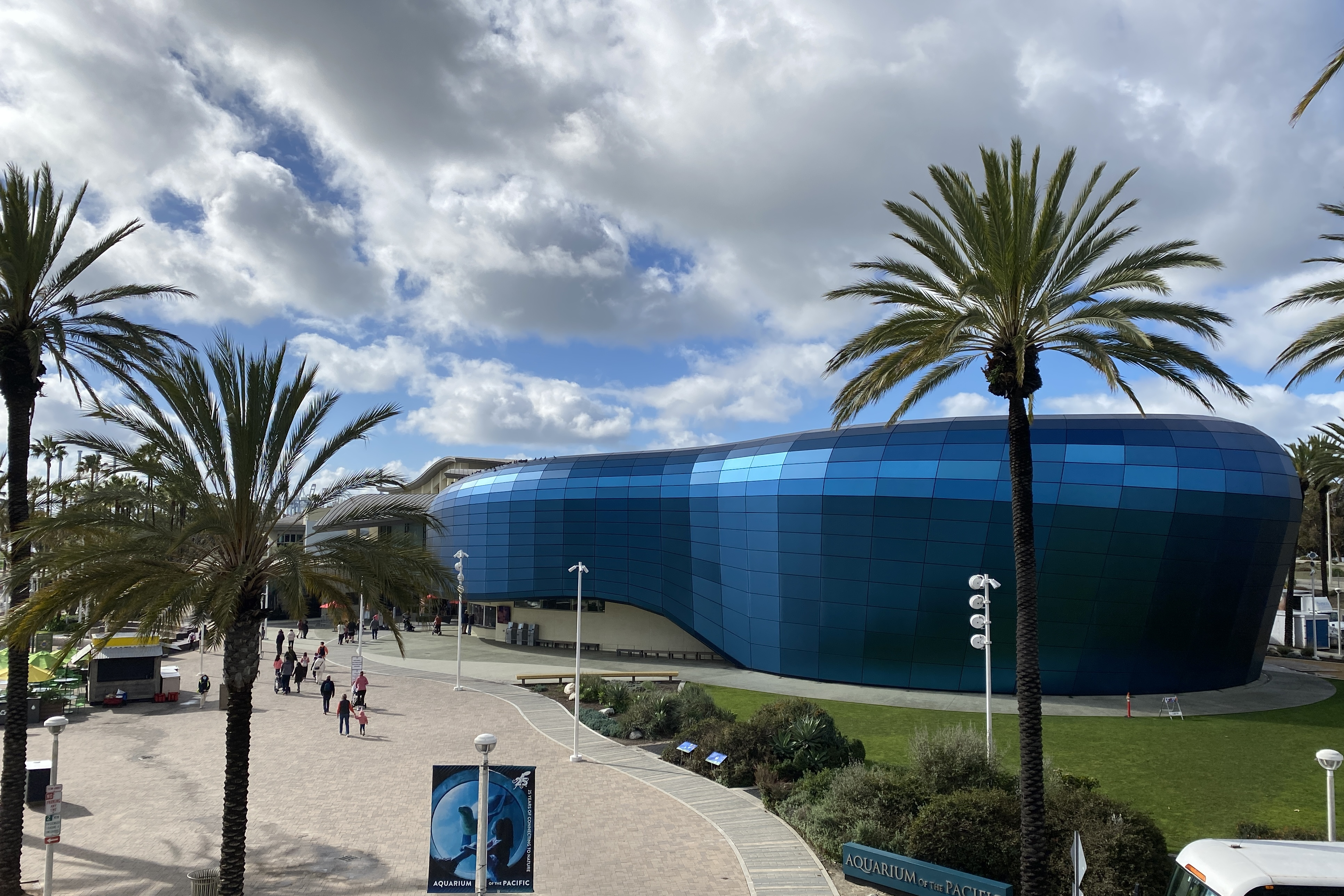
- Aquarium of the Pacific in February 2024
- Interactive map of Aquarium of the Pacific
- 33.76216°N 118.19692°W
- Date opened: June 20, 1998
- Location: Long Beach, California, United States
- Land area: 6 acres (24,000 m^{2})
- No. of animals: 12,000
- Volume of largest tank: 350,000 US gallons (1,300,000 L)
- Annual visitors: 1.7 million (2018)
- Memberships: AZA
- Major exhibits: Jelly Dreamscapes, Stars of the Sea, Frogs: Facing a Changing World, Southern California Gallery, June Keyes Penguin Habitat, Shark Lagoon, Sea Otter Habitat
- Public transit: Downtown Long Beach (A Line)
- Website: www.aquariumofpacific.org

The Aquarium of the Pacific (formerly the Long Beach Aquarium of the Pacific) is a public aquarium on a 6-acre (24,000 m^{2}) site on Rainbow Harbor in Long Beach, California, United States. It is situated across the water from the Long Beach Convention Center, Shoreline Village, and the Queen Mary Hotel and Attraction. The location also has its own street, Aquarium Way. It opened on June 20, 1998.

The aquarium had 1,979 volunteers and employed 485 people in 2024. In 2018, it had 1.7 million visitors. It is a 501(c)(3) non-profit with Association of Zoos and Aquariums (AZA) accreditation through March 2031.

== Exhibits ==
The aquarium features a collection of over 12,000 animals in exhibits from 5,000 US gallons (19,000 L) to 350,000 US gallons (1,300,000 L) in capacity.

The Pacific Ocean is the focus of three major permanent galleries: Southern California/Baja Gallery, Northern Pacific Gallery, and Tropical Pacific Gallery. These exhibits introduce the inhabitants and seascapes, and include conservation messages specific to each region.

=== Southern California/Baja Gallery ===
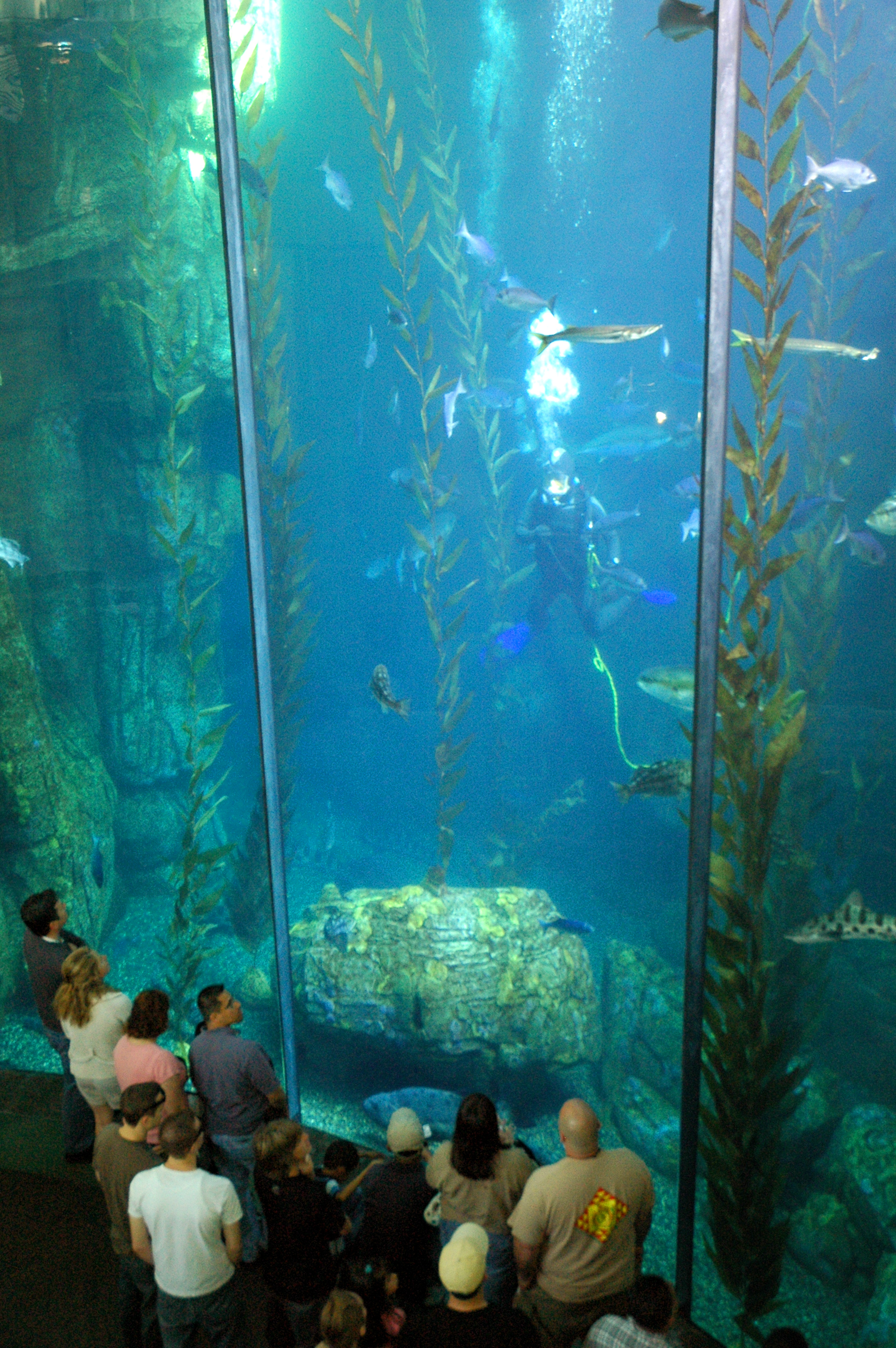
A diver addressing a group of visitors using a specially adapted mask in the Honda Blue Cavern tank

The Southern California/Baja Gallery features the varied habitats of this region. The first exhibit is the 142,000-US-gallon (540,000 L) three-story Honda Blue Cavern tank, which houses animals that live in the waters surrounding Catalina Island.

Next is the Casino Point exhibit, which replicates a giant kelp forest with Garibaldi, California scorpionfish, and other representative organisms. The Gulf of California exhibit houses Cortez rainbow wrasse, Mexican lookdowns, porcupine fish, and others. Other areas of the gallery include the 211,000-US-gallon (800,000 L) Seal and Sea Lion Habitat, Ray Habitat Touchpool, and Shorebird Sanctuary.

=== Northern Pacific Gallery ===
The Northern Pacific Gallery focuses on organisms from the Bering Sea. Exhibits include the Sea Otter Habitat, home to southern sea otters; the giant Pacific octopus tank; and the Diving Birds Exhibit, where puffins and auklets live. Other species on display include Japanese spider crabs, jellyfish, and sea anemones.

== Gallery ==
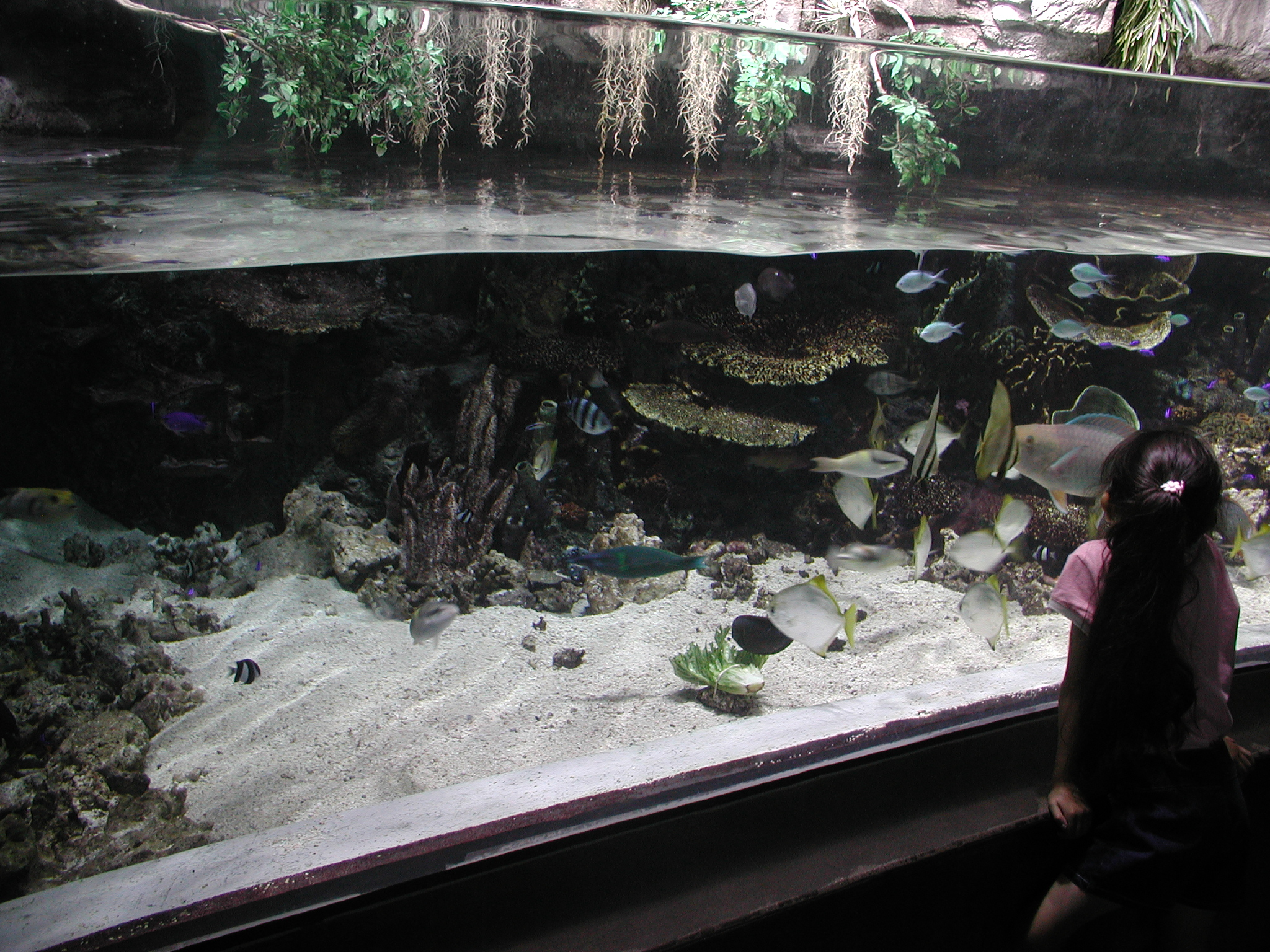
Entrance to the Tropical Pacific Gallery, designed to replicate a tropical coral reef lagoon.

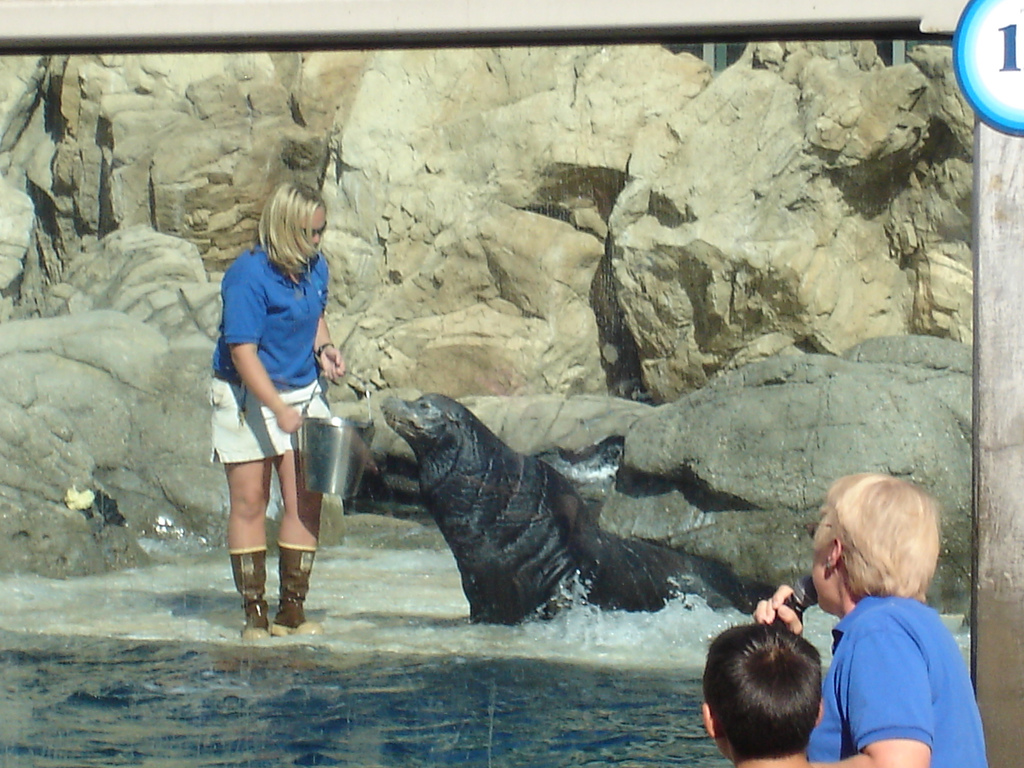
California sea lion (Zalophus californianus) during a training session.

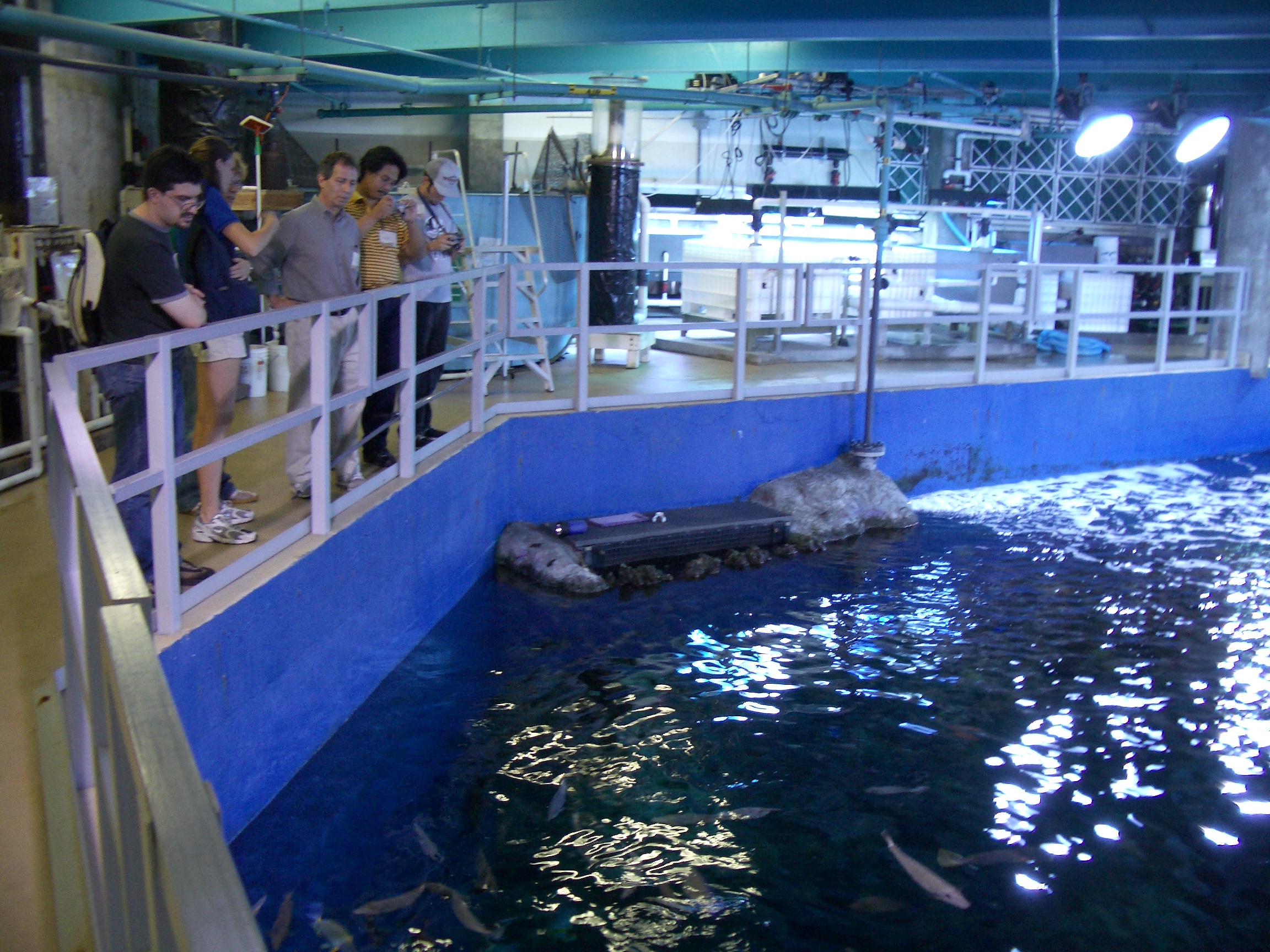
Top of 350,000 gallon tropical habitat, viewable only during behind-the-scenes tours.

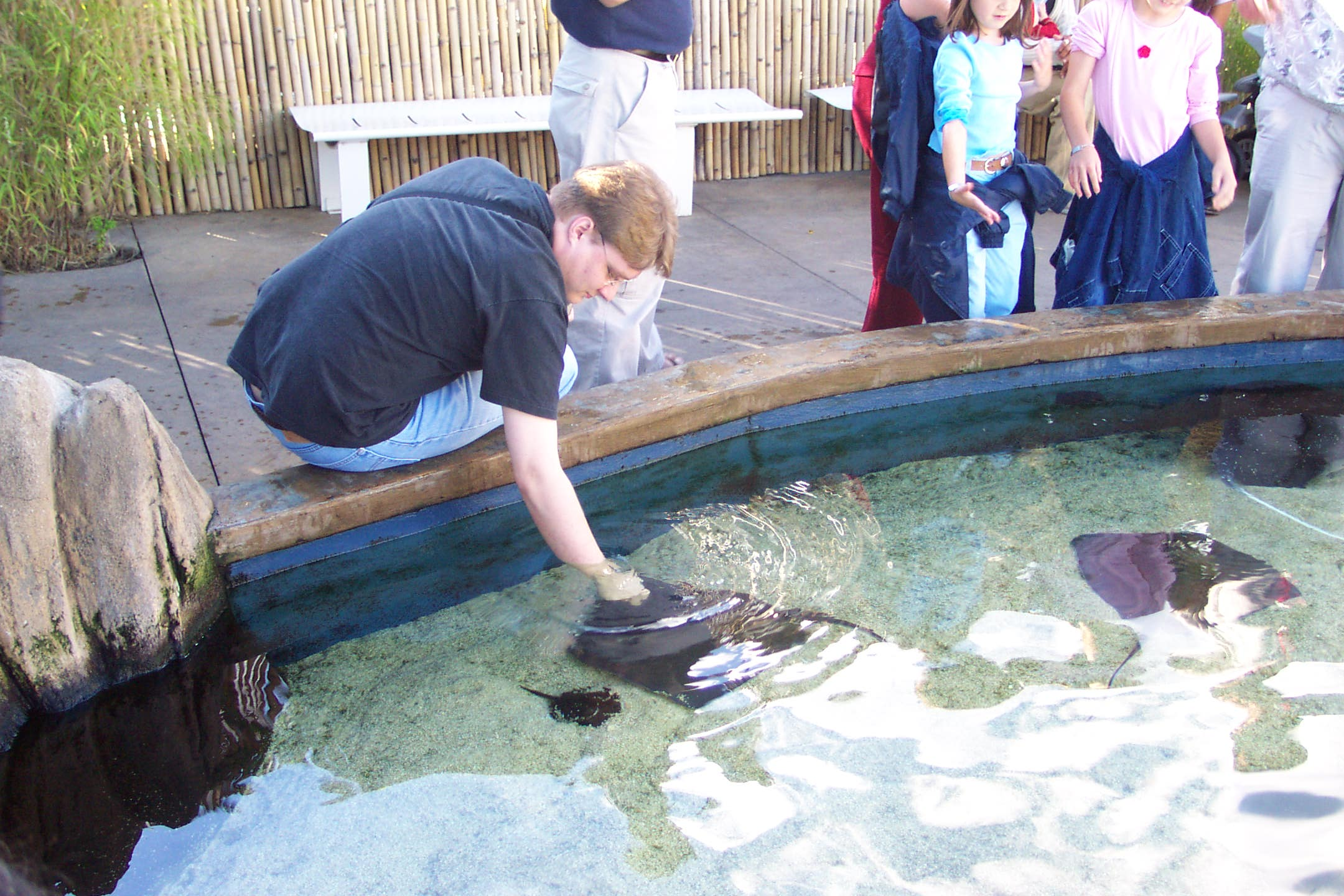
Southern stingrays (Hypanus americanus) in one of Shark Lagoon's touch pools.

Video of leafy seadragons (Phycodurus eques) eating.
