= November =

Eleventh month in the Julian and Gregorian calendars

<<	November					>>
Su	Mo	Tu	We	Th	Fr	Sa
1	2	3	4	5	6	7
8	9	10	11	12	13	14
15	16	17	18	19	20	21
22	23	24	25	26	27	28
29	30
2026

November is the eleventh month of the year in the Julian and Gregorian calendars. Its length is 30 days. November was the ninth month of the calendar of Romulus c. 750 BC. November retained its name (from the Latin novem meaning "nine") when January and February were added to the Roman calendar. November is a month of late spring in the Southern Hemisphere and late autumn in the Northern Hemisphere. Therefore, November in the Southern Hemisphere is the seasonal equivalent of May in the Northern Hemisphere and vice versa. In Ancient Rome, Ludi Plebeii was held from November 4–17, Epulum Jovis was held on November 13 and Brumalia celebrations began on November 24. These dates do not correspond to the modern Gregorian calendar.

November was referred to as Blōtmōnaþ by the Anglo-Saxons. Brumaire and Frimaire were the months on which November fell in the French Republican calendar.

== Astronomy ==
In recent decades, the number of warm temperature records in November has outpaced cold temperature records over a growing portion of Earth's surface.

Chart shows changes in global average temperature annually in November of each year

November meteor showers include the Andromedids, which occurs from September 25 to December 6 and generally peak around November 9–14, the Leonids, which occurs from November 15–20, the Alpha Monocerotids, which occurs from November 15–25 with the peak on November 21–22, the Northern Taurids, which occurs from October 20 to December 10, and the Southern Taurids, which occurs from September 10 – November 20, and the Phoenicids; which occur from November 29 to December 9 with the peak occurring on December 5–6. The Orionids, which occurs in late October, sometimes lasts into November.

== Astrology ==
The Western zodiac signs for November are Scorpio (October 23 – November 21) and Sagittarius (November 22 – December 21).

== Symbols ==
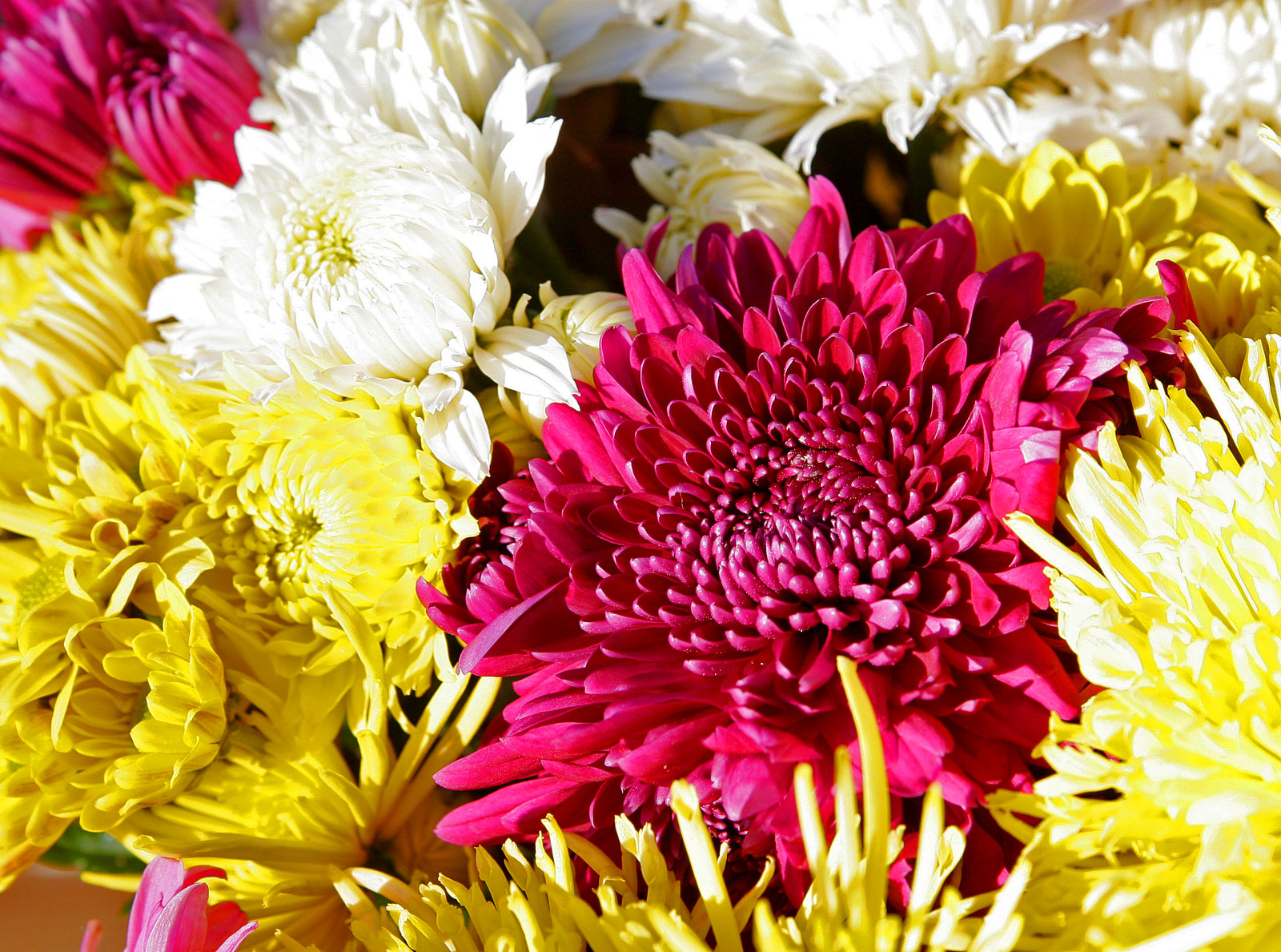
Chrysanthemum

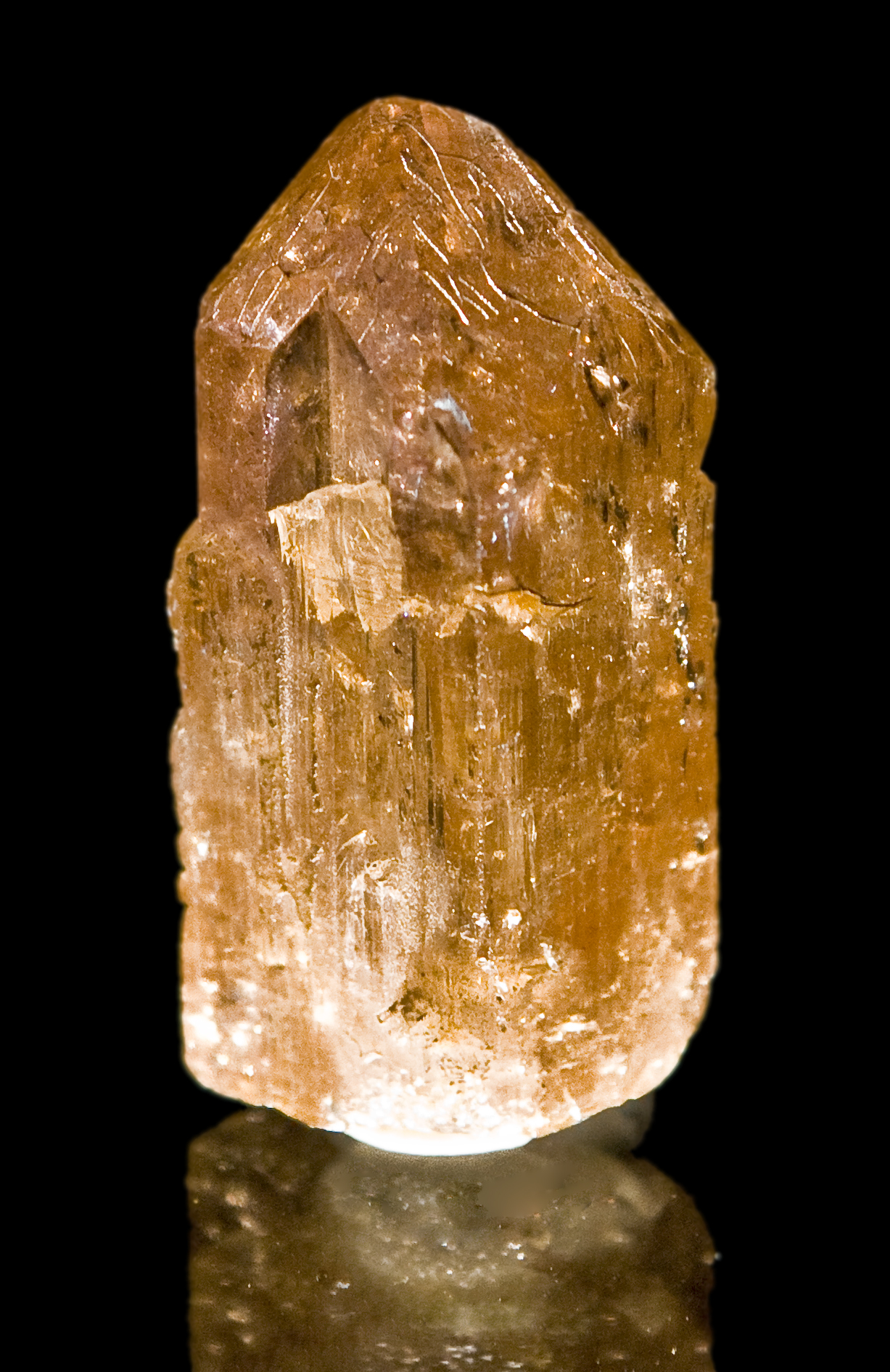
Topaz crystal

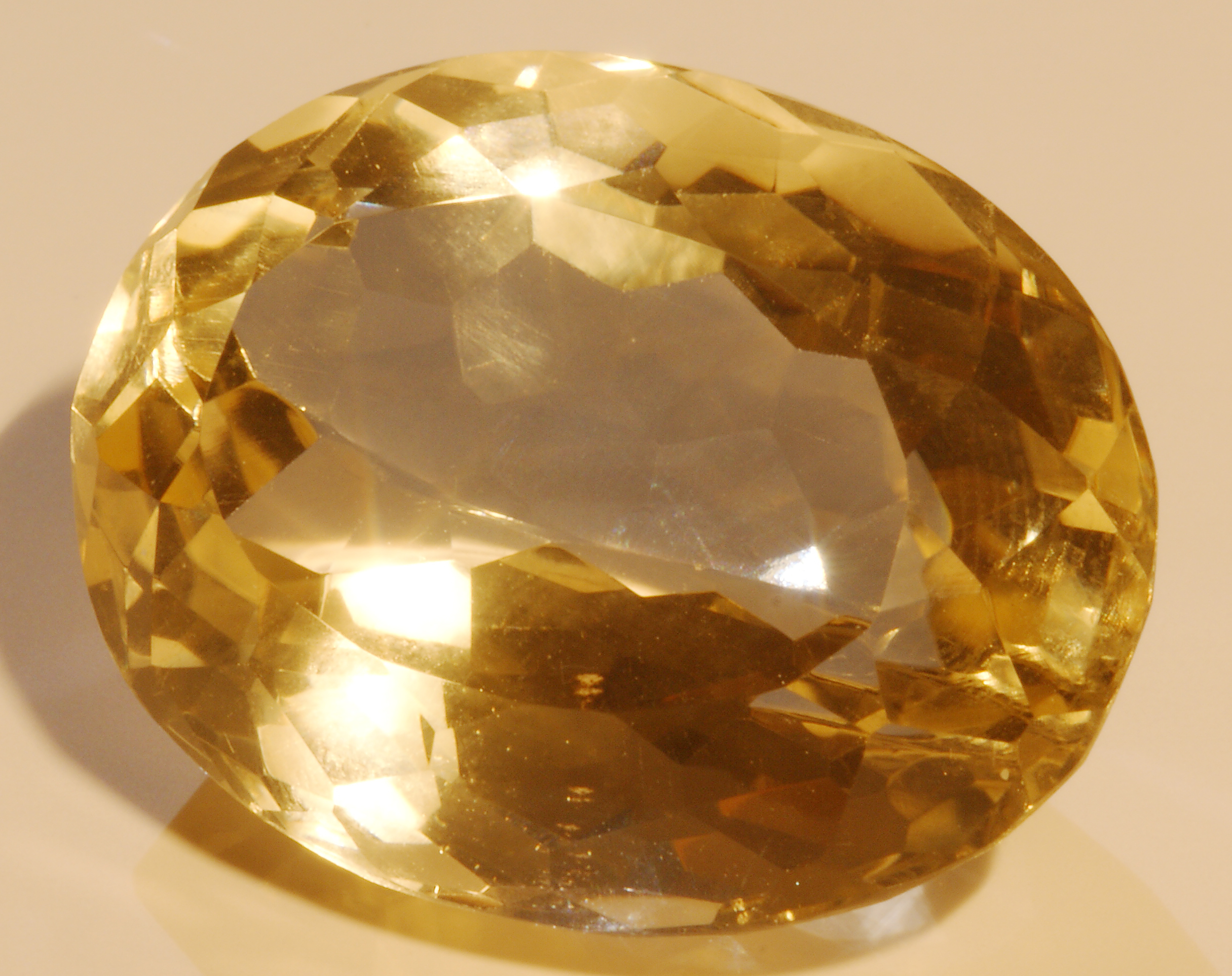
Citrine gemstone

November's birthstone is the topaz (particularly, yellow) which symbolizes friendship and the citrine. Its birth flower is the chrysanthemum.

== Observances ==
This list does not necessarily imply either official status or general observance.

=== Non-Gregorian ===
(All Baha'i, Islamic, and Jewish observances begin at the sundown prior to the date listed, and end at sundown of the date in question unless otherwise noted.)

- List of observances set by the Bahá'í calendar
- List of observances set by the Chinese calendar
- List of observances set by the Hebrew calendar
- List of observances set by the Islamic calendar
- List of observances set by the Solar Hijri calendar

=== Month-long ===
- In Catholic tradition, November is the Month for prayer for the Holy Souls in Purgatory. A November List or November Dead List is sometimes maintained for this purpose.
- Academic Writing Month
- Annual Family Reunion Planning Month
- Lung Cancer Awareness Month
- Movember
- National Novel Writing Month
- No Nut November
- Pancreatic Cancer Awareness Month (Global)
- Pulmonary Hypertension Awareness Month
- Stomach Cancer Awareness Month
- Dinovember

==== United States ====
- Native American Heritage Month
- COPD Awareness Month
- Epilepsy Awareness Month
- Military Family Month
- National Adoption Month
- National Alzheimer's Disease Awareness Month
- National Blog Posting Month
- National Critical Infrastructure Protection Month
- National Entrepreneurship Month
- National Family Caregivers Month
- National Bone Marrow Donor Awareness Month
- National Diabetes Month
- National Homeless Youth Month
- National Hospice Month
- National Impaired Driving Prevention Month
- National Pomegranate Month
- Prematurity Awareness Month

=== Movable ===
- Mitzvah Day International: November 15
- See also Movable Western Christian observances
- See also Movable Eastern Christian observances

First Sunday

- Daylight saving time ends (United States and Canada)

First Monday

- Recreation Day holiday (Northern Tasmania)

Tuesday after the first Monday

- Election Day (United States)

First Wednesday

- National Eating Healthy Day (United States)

First Thursday

- International Stout Day
- Thanksgiving (Liberia)
- National Men Make Dinner Day (United States)
- International day against violence and bullying at school including cyberbullying

First Friday

- Arbor Day (Samoa)

First Saturday

- Children's Day (South Africa)
- Health Day (Turkmenistan)
- National Bison Day (United States)

Second Sunday

- Father's Day (Estonia, Finland, Iceland, Norway, and Sweden)
- Grandparents Day (South Sudan)
- National Day of the Pupusa (El Salvador)
- Remembrance Sunday (United Kingdom, Commonwealth)

Week of November 8

- National Radiologic Technology Week (United States)

Week of November 11

- Celebrate Freedom Week (Oklahoma, United States)

Second Monday:

- Barack Obama Day (Perry County, Alabama, United States)
- Heir to the Throne's Birthday (Tuvalu)

Second Saturday

- National Tree Planting Day (Luxembourg)

Third Sunday:

- World Day of Remembrance for Road Traffic Victims (United Nations observance)

Third week

- Geography Awareness Week
- Revolution Day (Mexico)

Weekdays of the third week

- Anti-Bullying Week (United Kingdom)
- American Education Week (United States)

Wednesday of the third week

- GIS Day

Third Thursday

- Great American Smokeout (United States)
- World Philosophy Day (United Nations)

Third Friday

- International Stand Up to Bullying Day

Third Friday until the next Monday

- El Buen Fin (Mexico)

Saturday before Fourth Thursday

- National Adoption Day (United States)
- National Survivors of Suicide Day (United States)

Last Week

- AIDS Awareness Week (Canada)

Day before fourth Thursday

- Blackout Wednesday (United States)

Last Wednesday

- Thanksgiving (Norfolk Island, Australia)

Fourth Thursday

- Thanksgiving (United States)

Day after fourth Thursday

- Black Friday (United States)
  - Buy Nothing Day (United States)
- Fur Free Friday (International observance)
- National Day of Listening (United States)
- Native American Heritage Day (United States)
- Sinkie Day (United States)

Fourth Saturday

- Holodomor Memorial Day (Canada, Ukraine)

Saturday after Thanksgiving

- Small Business Saturday (United States)

Fourth Sunday

- National Grandparents Day (Singapore)

Last Sunday

- Harvest Festival (Turkmenistan)

Monday after fourth Thursday in November

- Cyber Monday

=== Fixed ===
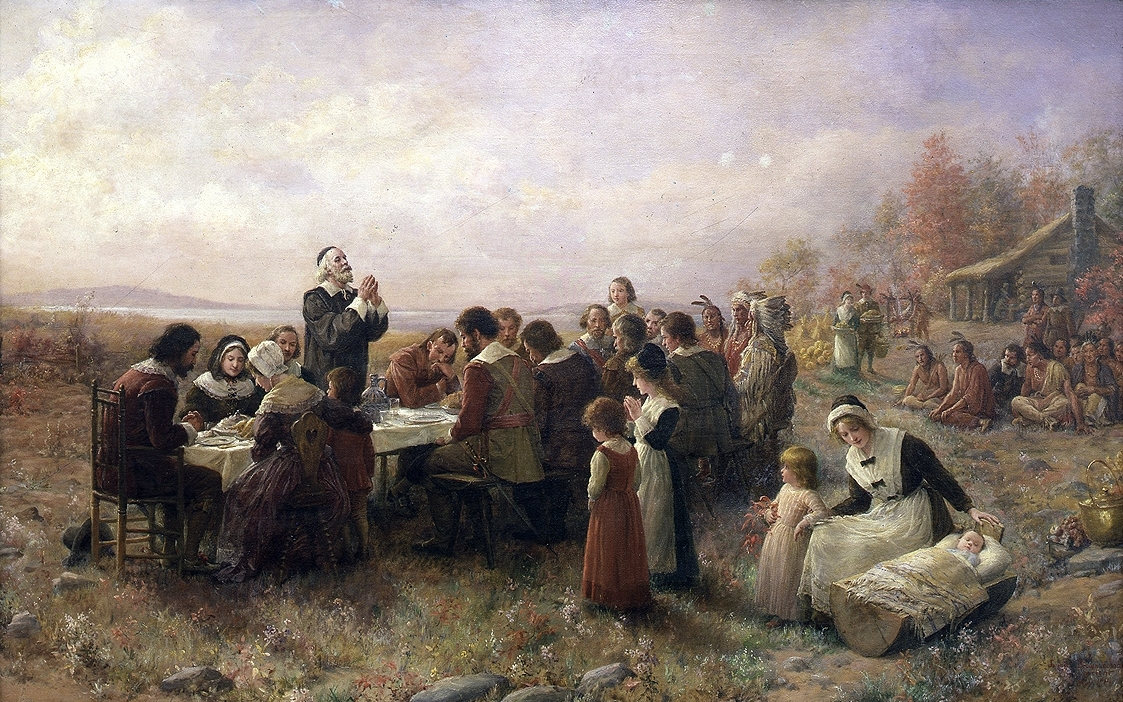
Thanksgiving is celebrated in November

- November 1
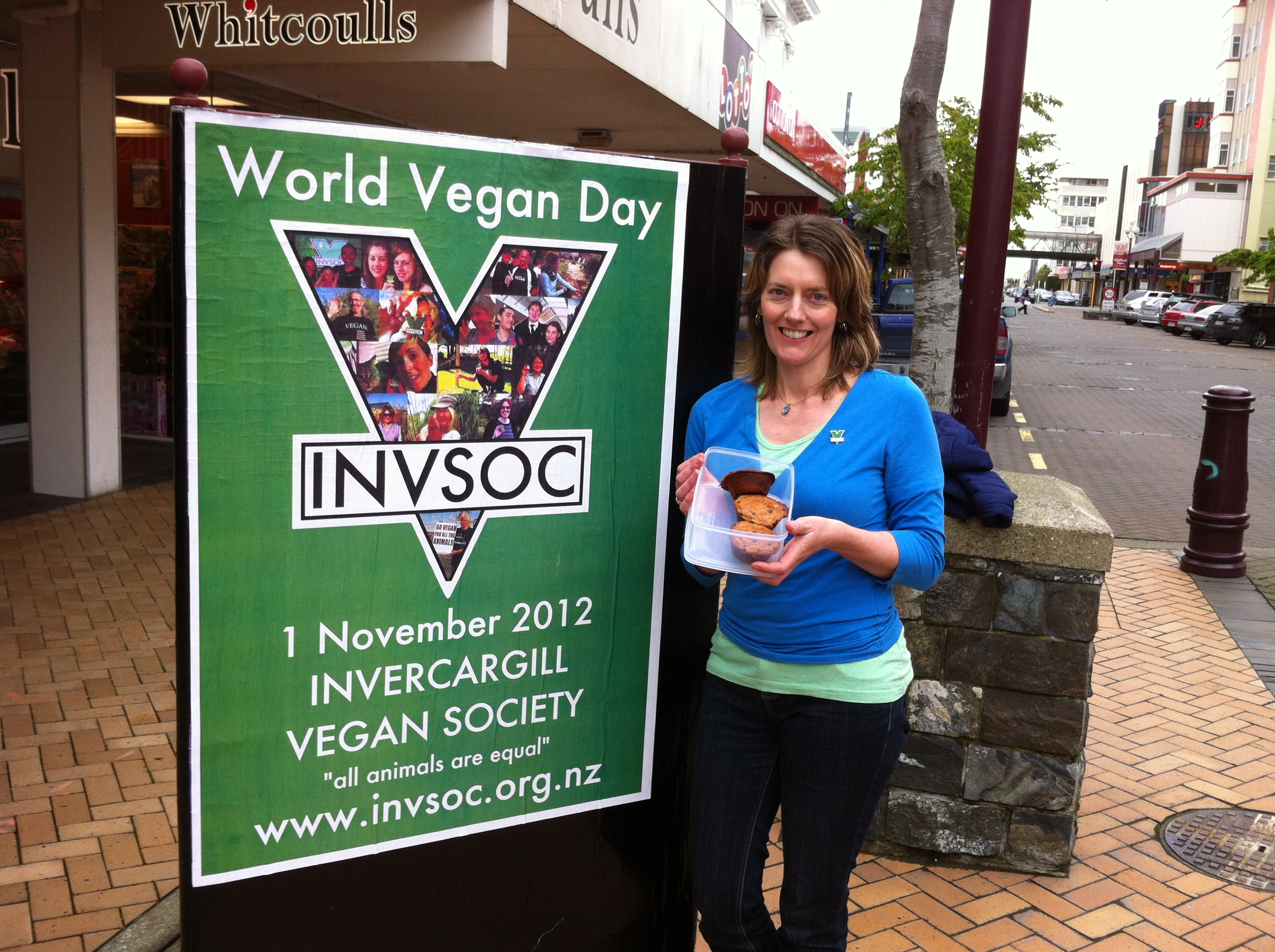
  A Vegan activist gives out baked goods for World Vegan Day
  - All Saints' Day (Catholicism)
    - Day of the Dead, first day: Day of the Innocents (Haiti, Mexico)
  - Andhra Pradesh Formation Day (Andhra Pradesh, India)
  - Anniversary of the Revolution (Algeria)
  - Calan Gaeaf, celebrations start at dusk of October 31. (Wales)
  - Chavang Kut (Mizo people of Northeast India, Bangladesh, Burma)
  - Coronation of the fifth Druk Gyalpo (Bhutan)
  - Haryana Foundation Day (Haryana, India)
  - Independence Day (Antigua and Barbuda)
  - International Lennox-Gastaut Syndrome Awareness Day
  - Karnataka Foundation Day (Karnataka, India)
  - Kerala Foundation Day (Kerala, India)
  - Liberty Day (United States Virgin Islands)
  - National Awakening Day (Bulgaria)
  - Samhain in the Northern Hemisphere and Beltane in the Southern Hemisphere, celebrations start at sunset of October 31 (Neopagan Wheel of the Year)
  - Self-Defense Forces Commemoration Day (Japan)
  - World Vegan Day
- November 2
  - All Souls' Day (Roman Catholic Church and Anglican Communion)
  - Coronation of Haile Selassie (Rastafari)
  - Day of the Dead, second day (Mexico)
  - Dziady (Belarus)
  - Indian Arrival Day (Mauritius)
  - International Day to End Impunity for Crimes Against Journalists (United Nations)
  - Statehood Day (North Dakota and South Dakota, United States)
- November 3
  - Culture Day (Japan)
  - Independence Day (Dominica)
  - Independence Day (Micronesia)
  - Independence Day (Panama)
  - Independence Day of Cuenca (Ecuador)
  - Victory Day (Maldives)
- November 4
  - Community Service Day (Dominica)
  - Flag Day (Panama)
  - National Tonga Day (Tonga)
  - National Unity and Armed Forces Day (Italy)
  - Unity Day (Russia)
  - Yitzhak Rabin Memorial (Israel, unofficial, but widely commemorated)
- November 5
  - Bank Transfer Day (United States)
  - Colón Day (Panama)
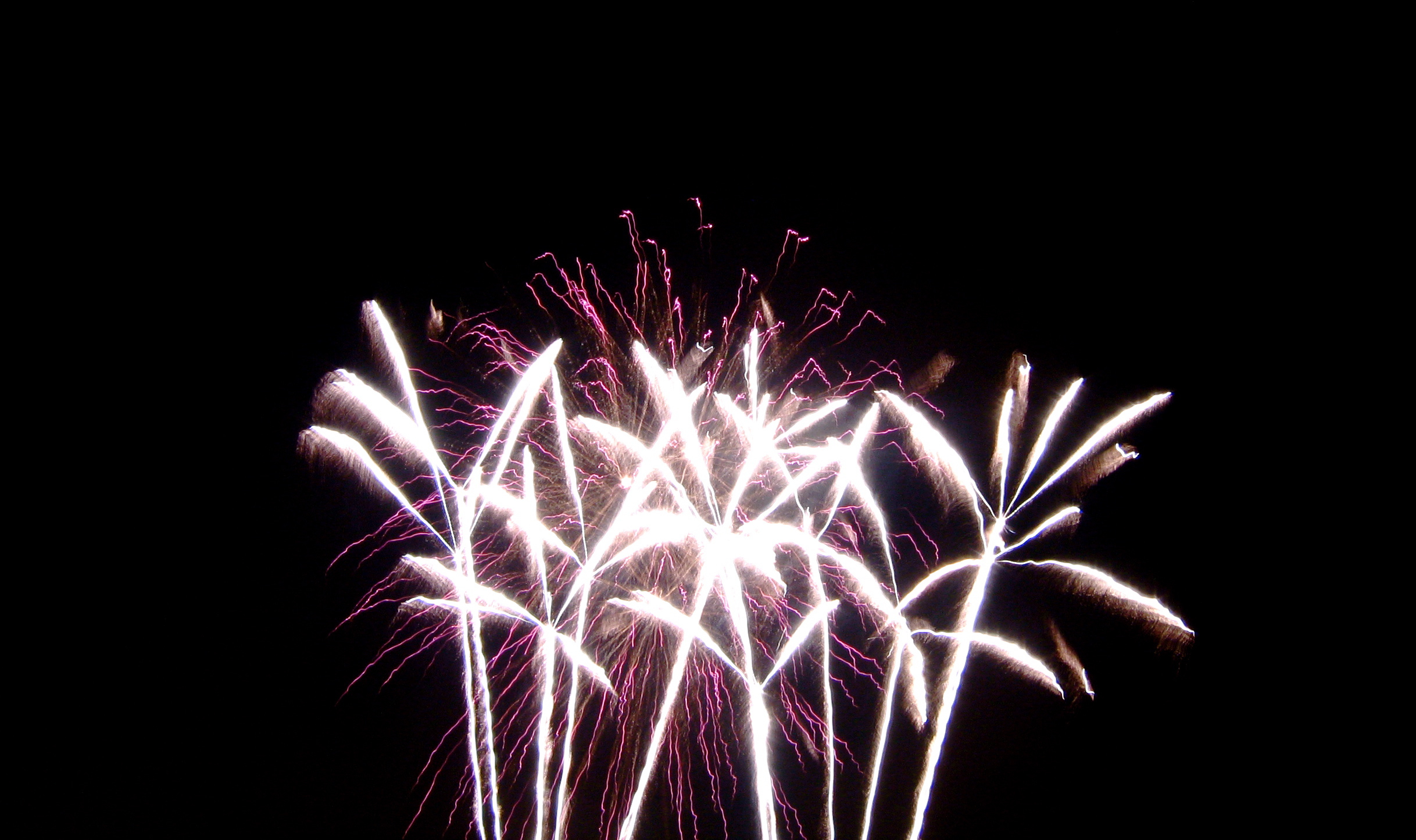
  - Guy Fawkes Night fireworks. Guy Fawkes Night is celebrated on November 5th in the United Kingdom.
    Guy Fawkes Night (United Kingdom, New Zealand and Newfoundland and Labrador, Canada), and its related observances:
    - West Country Carnival (English West Country)
  - Kanakadasa Jayanthi (Karnataka, India)
  - National Love Your Red Hair Day (Ireland)
- November 6
  - Arbor Day (Republic of Congo)
  - Constitution Day (Dominican Republic)
  - Finnish Swedish Heritage Day (Finland)
  - Green March (Morocco)
  - Gustavus Adolphus Day (Sweden)
  - International Day for Preventing the Exploitation of the Environment in War and Armed Conflict
  - Malaria Day in the Americas
- November 7
  - Commemoration Day (Tunisia)
  - Hungarian Opera Day (Hungary)
  - National Day (Northern Catalonia, France)
  - October Revolution Day (Belarus, Transnistria)
  - Tokhu Emong (Lotha Naga people of India)
- November 8
  - Intersex Day of Remembrance
  - Statehood Day, Montana, United States
- November 9
  - Independence Day (Cambodia)
- November 10
  - National Heroes Day (Indonesia)
  - Commemoration of Mustafa Kemal Atatürk (Turkey)
  - World Keratoconus Day
- November 11
  - Independence Day (Angola, Poland)
  - Veterans Day (United States)
  - Remembrance Day (Canada)
  - Statehood day of Washington State, United States
- November 12
  - Birthday of Sun Yat-Sen, also Doctors' Day and Cultural Renaissance Day (Taiwan)
  - Constitution Day (Azerbaijan)
  - Father's Day (Indonesia)
  - National Health Day (Indonesia)
  - National Youth Day (Timor-Leste)
  - World Pneumonia Day
- November 13
  - Sadie Hawkins Day (United States)
  - World Kindness Day
- November 14
  - Children's Day (India)
  - World Diabetes Day
- November 15
  - National Peace Day (Ivory Coast)
  - Independence Day (Palestine)
- November 16
  - Statehood Day Oklahoma, United States
- November 17
  - World Prematurity Day
- November 18
  - Day of Army and Victory (Haiti)
  - Proclamation Day of the Republic of Latvia (Latvia)
  - Independence Day (Morocco)
  - National Apple Cider Day (United States)
  - National Day (Oman)
  - National Vichyssoise Day (United States)
  - Remembrance Day of the Sacrifice of Vukovar in 1991 (Croatia)
  - Feast day of Saint Constant
- November 19
  - Carbonated Beverage with Caffeine Day (United States)
  - Day of Discovery of Puerto Rico (Puerto Rico)
  - Day of Missile Forces and Artillery (Russia, Belarus)
  - Flag Day (Brazil)
  - Garifuna Settlement Day (Belize)
  - International Men's Day
  - Monaco National Day (Monaco)
  - Women's Entrepreneurship Day
  - World Toilet Day
- November 20
  - 20-N (Spain)
  - Africa Industrialization Day (international)
  - Black Awareness Day (Brazil)
  - Children's Day
  - Day of National Sovereignty (Argentina)
  - Día de la Revolución (Mexico)
  - Revolution Day (Mexico)
  - Royal Thai Navy Day (Thailand)
  - Teachers' Day or Ngày nhà giáo Việt Nam (Vietnam)
  - Transgender Day of Remembrance
- November 21
  - Statehood Day North Carolina, United States
- November 22
  - Independence Day (Lebanon)
- November 23
  - Labor Thanksgiving Day (Japan)
  - Repudiation Day (Frederick County, Maryland, United States)
  - St George's Day (Georgia)
- November 24
  - Evolution Day (International observance)
  - Lachit Divas (Assam, India)
  - Martyrdom of Guru Tegh Bahadur (India)
  - Teachers' Day (Turkey)
- November 25
  - Evacuation Day (New York) (United States)
  - National Parfait Day (United States)
  - Independence Day (Suriname)
  - International Day for the Elimination of Violence against Women
  - National Day (Bosnia and Herzegovina)
  - St Catherine's Day
  - Teachers' Day or Hari Guru (Indonesia)
  - Vajiravudh Day (Thailand)
- November 26
  - Ace Visibility Day
  - Constitution Day (Abkhazia, Georgia)
  - Constitution Day (India)
  - National Cake Day (United States)
  - Republic Day (Mongolia)
- November 27
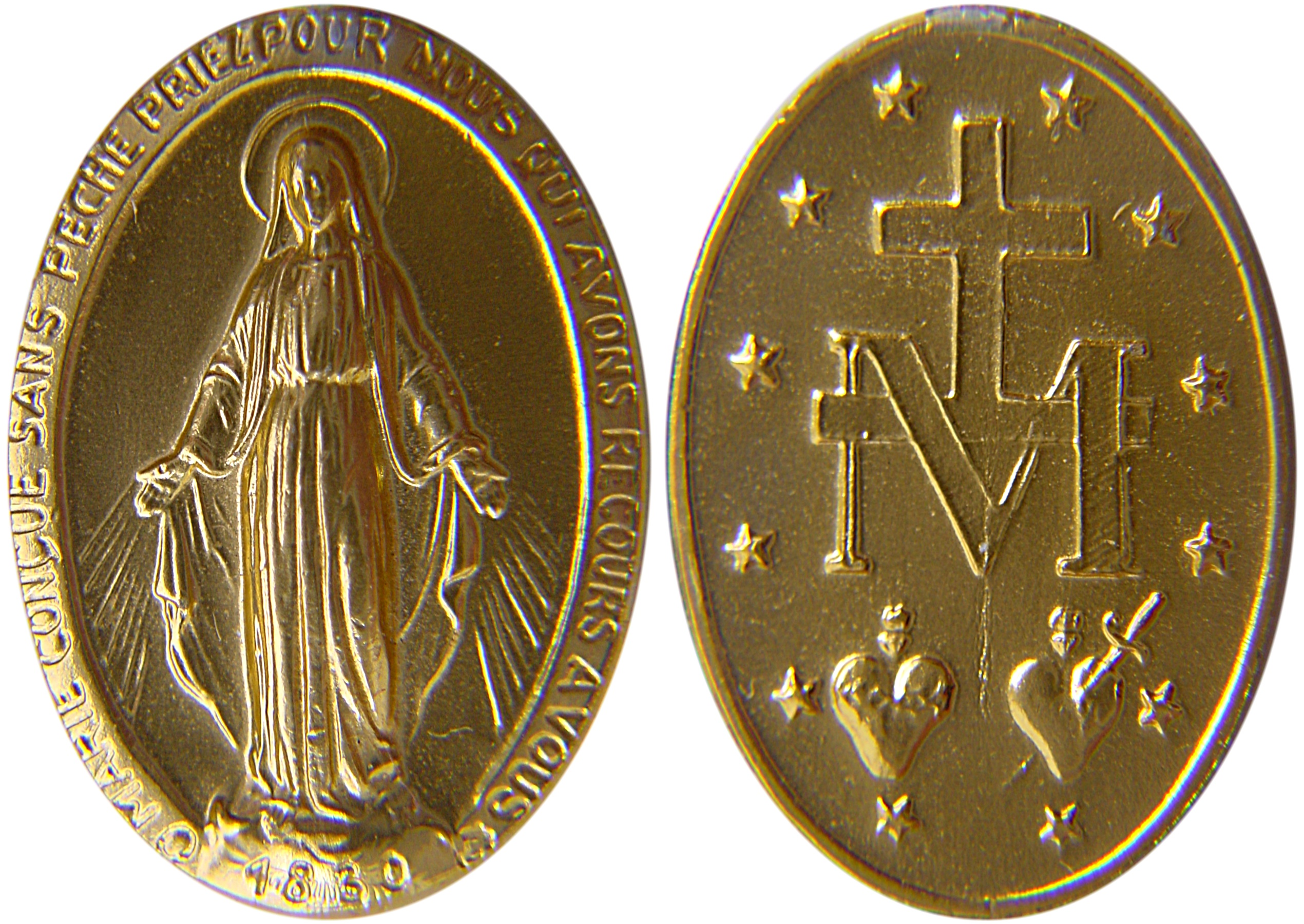
  The Miraculous Medal, whose design was created based on the apparitions of the Blessed Virgin Mary to Saint Catherine Labouré in Paris. In 1832, during an epidemic, the first medals were distributed, to which numerous healings and conversions were attributed, receiving the name of Miraculous Medal.
  - Our Lady of the Miraculous Medal (Roman Catholic)
  - Maaveerar Day (Tamil Eelam)
  - National Bavarian Cream Pie Day (United States)
  - Teacher's Day (Spain)
- November 28
  - Independence Day (Albania)
  - Independence Day (Mauritania)
  - Proclamation of Independence Day (Timor-Leste)
- November 29
- November 30
  - Bonifacio Day (Philippines)
  - St Andrews Day (official national holiday in Scotland)
