= November 19 =

November 19 this year in various calendars
- Thursday, 19 November 2026
Akan	Foyaw
Armenian	2 Kʿaloch 1476
Aztec	Tlacaxipehualiztli 8, 2 Cipactli
Babylonian	8 Arakhsamna, 2337 SE
Balinese pawukon	Menga, Pasah, Jaya, Keliwon, Tungleh, Wraspati of Ukir, Guru, Urungan, Manusa
Bengali	4 Ogrohayon, BS 1433
Chinese	Yin Fire Rooster・Dipper Mansion; Fire Horse Year, Month 10, Day 11 (Lidong, 3 days until Xiaoxue)
Common Era	19 November 2026 CE
Coptic	10 Hathor, AM 1743
Egyptian	7 Pharmuthi, 2775 NE
Ethiopian	10 H̱edār, 2019 Amätä Məhrät
French Republican	Décade III, Octidi de Brumaire de l'Année 235 de la République
Gregorian	19 November, AD 2026
Hebrew	9 Kislev, AM 5787
Hindu	Pūrvabhādrapada・Vyāghāta; Solar: 3 Mārgaśīrṣa, 1948 SE; Lunisolar: Daśamī, Śukla pakṣa of Kārtika, 2083 VE; Rāudra・5127 KY・1,872,898
Icelandic	Fimmtudagur, 27 Gormánuður 2026
Islamic	8 Jumada al-thani, AH 1448 (using tabular method)
ISO week date	2026-W47-4
Japanese	11 Kannazuki, Reiwa 8 (Rittō, 3 days until Shōsetsu)
Julian	6 November, AD 2026 (AM 7535)
Julian day	2461364
Korean	11 Dwaejidal, 4359 DE
Maya	13.0.14.2.1; 14 Ceh, 2 Imix
Roman	ante diem VIII Idus Novembres, MMDCCLXXIX AUC
Solar Hijri	28 Aban, SH 1405
Tibetan	10 smin drug, me pho rta 2153 or 1772 or 1000

<<	November					>>
Su	Mo	Tu	We	Th	Fr	Sa
1	2	3	4	5	6	7
8	9	10	11	12	13	14
15	16	17	18	19	20	21
22	23	24	25	26	27	28
29	30
2026

November 19 in recent years
2026 (Thursday)
2025 (Wednesday)
2024 (Tuesday)
2023 (Sunday)
2022 (Saturday)
2021 (Friday)
2020 (Thursday)
2019 (Tuesday)
2018 (Monday)
2017 (Sunday)

November 19 is the 323rd day of the year (324th in leap years) in the Gregorian calendar; 42 days remain until the end of the year.

== Events ==
=== Pre-1600 ===
- 461 – Libius Severus is declared emperor of the Western Roman Empire. The real power is in the hands of the magister militum Ricimer.
- 461 – Beginning of the papacy of pope Hilarius.
- 636 – The Rashidun Caliphate defeats the Sasanian Empire at the Battle of al-Qādisiyyah in Iraq.
- 1341 – Coronation of John V Palaiologos as Byzantine Emperor during the Byzantine civil war of 1341–1347.

=== 1601–1900 ===
- 1646 - The current Saint Peter's Basilica is consecrated in Rome, replacing an earlier basilica on the same site.
- 1794 – The United States and the Kingdom of Great Britain sign Jay's Treaty, which attempts to resolve some of the lingering problems left over from the American Revolutionary War.
- 1802 – The Garinagu arrive at British Honduras (present-day Belize).
- 1808 – Finnish War: The Convention of Olkijoki in Raahe ends hostilities in Finland.
- 1816 – Warsaw University is established.
- 1847 – The second Canadian railway line, the Montreal and Lachine Railroad, is opened.
- 1863 – American Civil War: U.S. President Abraham Lincoln delivers the Gettysburg Address at the dedication ceremony for the military cemetery at Gettysburg, Pennsylvania.
- 1881 – A meteorite lands near the village of Grossliebenthal, southwest of Odesa, Ukraine.
- 1885 – Serbo-Bulgarian War: Bulgarian victory in the Battle of Slivnitsa solidifies the unification between the Principality of Bulgaria and Eastern Rumelia.

=== 1901–present ===
- 1911 – The Doom Bar in Cornwall claims two ships, Island Maid and Angele, the latter killing the entire crew except the captain.
- 1912 – First Balkan War: The Serbian Army captures Bitola, ending the five-century-long Ottoman rule of Macedonia.
- 1916 – Samuel Goldwyn and Edgar Selwyn establish Goldwyn Pictures.
- 1941 – World War II: Battle between HMAS Sydney and HSK Kormoran. The two ships sink each other off the coast of Western Australia, with the loss of 645 Australians and about 77 German seamen.
- 1942 – World War II: Battle of Stalingrad: Soviet Union forces under General Georgy Zhukov launch the Operation Uranus counterattacks at Stalingrad, turning the tide of the battle in the USSR's favor.
- 1942 – Mutesa II is crowned the 35th and last Kabaka (king) of Buganda, prior to the restoration of the kingdom in 1993.
- 1943 – The Holocaust: Nazis liquidate Janowska concentration camp in Lemberg (Lviv), western Ukraine, murdering at least 6,000 Jews after a failed uprising and mass escape attempt.
- 1944 – World War II: U.S. President Franklin D. Roosevelt announces the sixth War Loan Drive, aimed at selling US$14 billion in war bonds to help pay for the war effort.
- 1944 – World War II: Thirty members of the Luxembourgish resistance defend the town of Vianden against a larger Waffen-SS attack in the Battle of Vianden.
- 1944 – The founding congress of the Communist Party of Transcarpathian Ukraine is held in Mukachevo.
- 1946 – Afghanistan, Iceland and Sweden join the United Nations.
- 1950 – US General Dwight D. Eisenhower becomes Supreme Commander of NATO-Europe.
- 1952 – Greek Field Marshal Alexander Papagos becomes the 152nd Prime Minister of Greece.
- 1954 – Télé Monte Carlo, Europe's oldest private television channel, is launched by Prince Rainier III.
- 1955 – National Review publishes its first issue.
- 1967 – The establishment of TVB, the first wireless commercial television station in Hong Kong.
- 1969 – Apollo program: Apollo 12 astronauts Pete Conrad and Alan Bean land at Oceanus Procellarum (the "Ocean of Storms") and become the third and fourth humans to walk on the Moon.
- 1969 – Association football player Pelé scores his 1,000th goal.
- 1977 – TAP Air Portugal Flight 425 crashes in the Madeira Islands, killing 131.
- 1977 – Egyptian President Anwar Sadat adresses the knesset during his visit to Jerusalem, calling for peace between Egypt and Israel.
- 1979 – Iran hostage crisis: Iranian leader Ayatollah Ruhollah Khomeini orders the release of 13 female and black American hostages being held at the US Embassy in Tehran.
- 1984 – San Juanico disaster: A series of explosions at the Pemex petroleum storage facility at San Juan Ixhuatepec in Mexico City starts a major fire and kills about 500 people.
- 1985 – Cold War: In Geneva, U.S. President Ronald Reagan and Soviet Union General Secretary Mikhail Gorbachev meet for the first time.
- 1985 – Pennzoil wins a US$10.53 billion judgment against Texaco, in the largest civil verdict in the history of the United States, stemming from Texaco executing a contract to buy Getty Oil after Pennzoil had entered into an unsigned, yet still binding, buyout contract with Getty.
- 1985 – Police in Baling, Malaysia, lay siege to houses occupied by an Islamic sect of about 400 people led by Ibrahim Mahmud.
- 1988 – Serbian communist representative and future Serbian and Yugoslav president Slobodan Milošević publicly declares that Serbia is under attack from Albanian separatists in Kosovo as well as internal treachery within Yugoslavia and a foreign conspiracy to destroy Serbia and Yugoslavia.
- 1993 – A factory fire killed 87 and injured 51 in Shenzhen, China.
- 1994 – In the United Kingdom, the first National Lottery draw is held. A £1 ticket gave a one-in-14-million chance of correctly guessing the winning six out of 49 numbers.
- 1996 – Space Shuttle program: Columbia is launched on STS-80, which would become the longest mission in the program at 17 days. On this mission, astronaut Story Musgrave becomes the only astronaut to fly on all five space shuttles.
- 1996 – A Beechcraft 1900 and a Beechcraft King Air collide at Quincy Regional Airport in Quincy, Illinois, killing 14.
- 1997 – Space Shuttle Columbia is launched on STS-87.
- 1998 – Clinton–Lewinsky scandal: The United States House of Representatives Judiciary Committee begins impeachment hearings into U.S. President Bill Clinton.
- 1999 – Shenzhou 1: The People's Republic of China launches its first Shenzhou spacecraft.
- 1999 – John Carpenter becomes the first person to win the top prize in the TV game show Who Wants to Be a Millionaire?
- 2001 – The Aviation and Transportation Security Act is enacted by the 107th United States Congress in the immediate aftermath of the September 11, 2001 attacks. The Act created the Transportation Security Administration (TSA).
- 2002 – The Greek oil tanker Prestige splits in half and sinks off the coast of Galicia, releasing over 76,000 m^{3} (20 million US gal) of oil in the largest environmental disaster in Spanish and Portuguese history.
- 2004 – The worst brawl in NBA history results in several players being suspended. Several players and fans are charged with assault and battery.
- 2006 – Nintendo release the Wii, a motion-controlled home video game console that sold over 101 million units and helped expand the gaming market to a broader audience.
- 2010 – The first of four explosions takes place at the Pike River Mine in New Zealand. Twenty-nine people are killed in the nation's worst mining disaster since 1914.
- 2013 – A double suicide bombing at the Iranian embassy in Beirut kills 23 people and injures 160 others.
- 2022 – A gunman kills five and injures 17 at Club Q, a gay nightclub in Colorado Springs, Colorado.
- 2023 – The 2023 Cricket World Cup final takes place at the Narendra Modi Stadium in Ahmedabad, India, played between host nation India and Australia.
- 2026 – The International Court of Justice delivers a 9-6 ruling finding Myanmar committed a genocide against the Rohingya people.
- 2026 – Rockstar Games releases Grand Theft Auto VI for PlayStation 5 and Xbox Series X/S, considered the most anticipated video game in history.

== Births ==
=== Pre-1600 ===
- 1417 – Frederick I, Count Palatine of Simmern (died 1480)
- 1464 – Emperor Go-Kashiwabara of Japan (died 1526)
- 1503 – Pier Luigi Farnese, Duke of Parma (died 1547)
- 1563 – Robert Sidney, 1st Earl of Leicester, English poet and politician (died 1626)
- 1600 – Charles I of England, Scotland, and Ireland (died 1649)
- 1600 – Lieuwe van Aitzema, Dutch historian and diplomat (died 1669)

=== 1601–1900 ===
- 1617 – Eustache Le Sueur, French painter and educator (died 1655)
- 1700 – Jean-Antoine Nollet, French priest and physicist (died 1770)
- 1711 – Mikhail Lomonosov, Russian physicist, chemist, astronomer, and geographer (died 1765)
- 1722 – Leopold Auenbrugger, Austrian physician (died 1809)
- 1722 – Benjamin Chew, American lawyer and judge (died 1810)
- 1752 – George Rogers Clark, American general (died 1818)
- 1765 – Filippo Castagna, Maltese politician (died 1830)
- 1770 – Bertel Thorvaldsen, Danish sculptor and academic (died 1844)
- 1802 – Solomon Foot, American lawyer and politician (died 1866)
- 1805 – Ferdinand de Lesseps, French diplomat and engineer, developed the Suez Canal (died 1894)
- 1808 – Janez Bleiweis, Slovenian journalist, physician, and politician (died 1881)
- 1812 – Karl Schwarz, German theologian and politician (died 1885)
- 1828 – Rani Lakshmibai, Indian queen (died 1858)
- 1831 – James A. Garfield, American general, lawyer, and politician, 20th President of the United States (died 1881)
- 1833 – Wilhelm Dilthey, German psychologist, sociologist, and historian (died 1911)
- 1834 – Georg Hermann Quincke, German physicist and academic (died 1924)
- 1843 – Richard Avenarius, German-Swiss philosopher and academic (died 1896)
- 1843 – C. X. Larrabee, American businessman (died 1914)
- 1845 – Agnes Giberne, Indian-English astronomer and author (died 1939)
- 1858 – Gina Oselio, Norwegian opera singer (died 1937).
- 1859 – Mikhail Ippolitov-Ivanov, Russian composer, conductor, and educator (died 1935)
- 1862 – Billy Sunday, American baseball player and evangelist (died 1935)
- 1873 – Elizabeth McCombs, the first woman elected to the Parliament of New Zealand (died 1935)
- 1875 – Mikhail Kalinin, Russian civil servant and politician, 1st Head of State of The Soviet Union (died 1946)
- 1876 – Tatyana Afanasyeva, Russian-Dutch mathematician and theorist (died 1964)
- 1877 – Giuseppe Volpi, Italian businessman and politician, founded the Venice Film Festival (died 1947)
- 1883 – Ned Sparks, Canadian-American actor and singer (died 1957)
- 1887 – James B. Sumner, American chemist and academic, Nobel Prize laureate (died 1955)
- 1888 – José Raúl Capablanca, Cuban-American chess player and theologian (died 1942)
- 1889 – Clifton Webb, American actor, singer, and dancer (died 1966)
- 1892 – Thomas Clay, English footballer and coach (died 1949)
- 1892 – Huw T. Edwards, Welsh poet and politician (died 1970)
- 1893 – René Voisin, French trumpet player (died 1952)
- 1894 – Américo Tomás, Portuguese admiral and politician, 14th President of Portugal (died 1987)
- 1895 – Louise Dahl-Wolfe, American photographer (died 1989)
- 1895 – Evert van Linge, Dutch footballer and architect (died 1964)
- 1896 – Anton Walbrook, Austrian actor (died 1967)
- 1897 – Quentin Roosevelt, American lieutenant and pilot (died 1918)
- 1898 – Klement Jug, Slovenian philosopher and mountaineer (died 1924)
- 1898 – Arthur R. von Hippel, German-American physicist and academic (died 2003)
- 1899 – Abu al-Qasim al-Khoei, Iranian religious leader and scholar (died 1992)
- 1899 – Allen Tate, American poet and critic (died 1979)
- 1900 – Bunny Ahearne, Irish-English ice hockey player and manager (died 1985)
- 1900 – Mikhail Lavrentyev, Russian mathematician and hydrodynamicist (died 1980)
- 1900 – Anna Seghers, German author and politician (died 1983)

=== 1901–present ===
- 1901 – Nina Bari, Russian mathematician (died 1961)
- 1904 – Nathan Freudenthal Leopold, Jr., American murderer (died 1971)
- 1905 – Eleanor Audley, American actress (died 1991)
- 1905 – Tommy Dorsey, American trombonist, composer and bandleader (died 1956)
- 1906 – Franz Schädle, German SS officer (died 1945)
- 1907 – Hans Liska, Austrian-German artist (died 1983)
- 1907 – Jack Schaefer, American author (died 1991)
- 1909 – Peter Drucker, Austrian-American theorist, educator, and author (died 2005).
- 1909 – Carlos López Moctezuma, Mexican actor (died 1980).
- 1910 – Adrian Conan Doyle, English race car driver, author, and explorer (died 1970)
- 1912 – Bernard Joseph McLaughlin, American bishop (died 2015)
- 1912 – George Emil Palade, Romanian-American biologist and physician, Nobel Prize laureate (died 2008)
- 1912 – Robert Simpson, American meteorologist and author (died 2014)
- 1915 – Earl Wilbur Sutherland, Jr., American pharmacologist and biochemist, Nobel Prize laureate (died 1974)
- 1917 – Indira Gandhi, Indian politician, 3rd Prime Minister of India (died 1984)
- 1919 – Gillo Pontecorvo, Italian director and screenwriter (died 2006)
- 1919 – Alan Young, English-Canadian actor, singer, and director (died 2016)
- 1920 – Gene Tierney, American actress and singer (died 1991)
- 1921 – Roy Campanella, American baseball player and coach (died 1993)
- 1921 – Peter Ruckman, American pastor and educator (died 2016)
- 1922 – Salil Chowdhury, Indian director, playwright, and composer (died 1995)
- 1922 – Yuri Knorozov, Ukrainian-Russian linguist, epigrapher, and ethnographer (died 1999)
- 1922 – Rajko Mitić, Serbian footballer and coach (died 2008)
- 1923 – Louis D. Rubin, Jr., American author, critic, and academic (died 2013)
- 1924 – Jane Freilicher, American painter and poet (died 2014)
- 1924 – William Russell, English actor (died 2024)
- 1924 – Knut Steen, Norwegian-Italian sculptor (died 2011)
- 1924 – Margaret Turner-Warwick, English physician and academic (died 2017)
- 1925 – Zygmunt Bauman, Polish-English sociologist, historian, and academic (died 2017)
- 1926 – Jeane Kirkpatrick, American academic and diplomat, 16th United States Ambassador to the United Nations (died 2006)
- 1926 – Pino Rauti, Italian journalist and politician (died 2012)
- 1926 – Barry Reckord, Jamaican playwright and screenwriter (died 2011)
- 1928 – Dara Singh, Indian wrestler, actor, and politician (died 2012)
- 1929 – Norman Cantor, Canadian-American historian and scholar (died 2004)
- 1930 – Kurt Nielsen, Danish tennis player, referee, and sportscaster (died 2011)
- 1932 – Eleanor F. Helin, American astronomer (died 2009)
- 1933 – Larry King, American journalist and talk show host (died 2021)
- 1933 – Jerry Sheindlin, American judge and author
- 1934 – Kurt Hamrin, Swedish footballer and scout (died 2024)
- 1934 – Valentin Ivanov, Russian footballer and manager (died 2011)
- 1934 – David Lloyd-Jones, English conductor (died 2022)
- 1935 – Rashad Khalifa, Egyptian-American biochemist and scholar (died 1990)
- 1935 – Jack Welch, American engineer, businessman, and author (died 2020)
- 1936 – Dick Cavett, American actor and talk show host
- 1936 – Ray Collins, American singer (died 2012)
- 1936 – Yuan T. Lee, Taiwanese-American chemist and academic, Nobel Prize laureate
- 1936 – Ljubiša Samardžić, Serbian actor and director (died 2017)
- 1937 – Penelope Leach, English psychologist and author
- 1938 – Len Killeen, South African rugby league player (died 2011)
- 1938 – Frank Misson, Australian cricketer (died 2024)
- 1938 – Ted Turner, American businessman and philanthropist, founded Turner Broadcasting System (died 2026)
- 1939 – Emil Constantinescu, Romanian academic and politician, 3rd President of Romania
- 1939 – Tom Harkin, American lawyer and politician
- 1939 – Jane Mansbridge, American political scientist and academic
- 1939 – Warren "Pete" Moore, American singer-songwriter and record producer (died 2017)
- 1939 – Richard Zare, American chemist and academic
- 1940 – Gary Gruber, author and expert on test-prep (died 2019)
- 1941 – Dan Haggerty, American actor and producer (died 2016)
- 1941 – Tommy Thompson, American captain and politician, 42nd Governor of Wisconsin, 19th United States Secretary of Health and Human Services
- 1942 – Roland Clift, English engineer and academic
- 1942 – Larry Gilbert, American golfer (died 1998)
- 1942 – Calvin Klein, American fashion designer, founded Calvin Klein Inc.
- 1942 – Sharon Olds, American poet and academic
- 1943 – Fred Lipsius, American saxophonist and educator
- 1943 – Aurelio Monteagudo, Cuban-American baseball player and manager (died 1990)
- 1944 – Agnes Baltsa, Greek soprano and actress
- 1944 – Dennis Hull, Canadian ice hockey player and sportscaster
- 1945 – Hans Monderman, Dutch engineer (died 2008)
- 1945 – Bobby Tolan, American baseball player and manager
- 1947 – Bob Boone, American baseball player and manager (d. 2026)
- 1947 – Anfinn Kallsberg, Faroese politician, 10th Prime Minister of the Faroe Islands (died 2024)
- 1947 – Lamar S. Smith, American lawyer and politician
- 1949 – Raymond Blanc, French chef and author
- 1949 – Ahmad Rashad, American football player and sportscaster
- 1950 – Peter Biyiasas, Greek-Canadian chess player
- 1951 – Charles Falconer, Baron Falconer of Thoroton, Scottish lawyer and politician, Lord High Chancellor of Great Britain
- 1953 – Robert Beltran, American actor
- 1953 – Tom Villard, American actor (died 1994)
- 1954 – Abdel Fattah el-Sisi, Egyptian field marshal and politician, 6th President of Egypt
- 1954 – Réjean Lemelin, Canadian ice hockey player and coach
- 1954 – Kathleen Quinlan, American actress
- 1955 – Sam Hamm, American screenwriter and producer
- 1956 – Eileen Collins, American colonel, pilot, and astronaut
- 1956 – Ann Curry, Guamanian-American journalist
- 1956 – Glynnis O'Connor, American actress
- 1956 – Sergiy Vilkomir, Ukrainian-born computer scientist (died 2020)
- 1957 – Ofra Haza, Israeli singer-songwriter and actress (died 2000)
- 1957 – Tom Virtue, American actor
- 1958 – Isabella Blow, English magazine editor (died 2007)
- 1958 – Algirdas Butkevičius, Lithuanian sergeant and politician, 12th Prime Minister of Lithuania
- 1958 – Terrence C. Carson, American actor and singer
- 1958 – Annette Gordon-Reed, American historian, author, and academic
- 1958 – Charlie Kaufman, American director, producer, and screenwriter
- 1958 – Michael Wilbon, American sportscaster and journalist
- 1959 – Robert Barron, American bishop, author, and theologian
- 1959 – Jo Bonner, American politician
- 1959 – Allison Janney, American actress
- 1960 – Miss Elizabeth, American wrestler and manager (died 2003)
- 1960 – Matt Sorum, American drummer, songwriter, and producer
- 1961 – Jim L. Mora, American football player and coach
- 1961 – Meg Ryan, American actress and producer
- 1961 – Pernille Svarre, Danish athlete
- 1962 – Jodie Foster, American actress, director, and producer
- 1962 – Sean Parnell, American lawyer and politician, 12th Governor of Alaska
- 1962 – Dodie Boy Peñalosa, Filipino boxer and trainer
- 1963 – Terry Farrell, American actress
- 1963 – Jon Potter, English-American field hockey player
- 1964 – Fred Diamond, American-English mathematician and academic
- 1964 – Vincent Herring, American saxophonist and flute player
- 1964 – Phil Hughes, Irish footballer and coach
- 1964 – Jung Jin-young, South Korean actor
- 1964 – Eric Musselman, American basketball player and coach
- 1964 – Nicholas Patrick, English-American engineer and astronaut
- 1965 – Laurent Blanc, French footballer and manager
- 1965 – Douglas Henshall, Scottish actor
- 1965 – Jason Pierce, English singer-songwriter and guitarist
- 1965 – Paulo S. L. M. Barreto, Brazilian cryptographer and academic
- 1965 – Paul Weitz, American actor, director, producer, screenwriter, and playwright
- 1966 – Shmuley Boteach, American rabbi and author
- 1966 – Gail Devers, American sprinter and hurdler
- 1966 – Rocco DiSpirito, American chef and author
- 1966 – Kakhaber Kacharava, Georgian footballer and manager
- 1966 – Jason Scott Lee, American actor and martial artist
- 1967 – Randi Kaye, American journalist
- 1968 – Anja Vanrobaeys, Belgian politician
- 1969 – Philippe Adams, Belgian race car driver
- 1969 – Erika Alexander, American actress and screenwriter
- 1969 – Ertuğrul Sağlam, Turkish footballer and coach
- 1969 – Richard Virenque, Moroccan-French cyclist and sportscaster
- 1971 – Saleemah Abdul-Ghafur, American author and activist
- 1971 – Justin Chancellor, English bass player
- 1971 – Jeremy McGrath, American motorcycle racer
- 1971 – Alice Peacock, American singer-songwriter
- 1971 – Tony Rich, American R&B singer-songwriter and musician
- 1971 – Dmitri Yushkevich, Russian ice hockey player
- 1972 – Sandrine Holt, English-American model and actress
- 1973 – Billy Currington, American singer-songwriter and guitarist
- 1973 – Savion Glover, American dancer and choreographer
- 1975 – Toby Bailey, American basketball player and agent
- 1975 – Sushmita Sen, Indian actress, model and Miss Universe 1994
- 1976 – Jack Dorsey, American businessman, co-founded Twitter
- 1976 – Robin Dunne, Canadian actor, producer, and screenwriter
- 1976 – Jun Shibata, Japanese singer-songwriter
- 1976 – Petr Sýkora, Czech ice hockey player
- 1976 – Stylianos Venetidis, Greek footballer and manager
- 1977 – Hina Rabbani Khar, Pakistani politician
- 1977 – Reid Scott, American actor
- 1977 – Kerri Strug, American gymnast
- 1978 – Dries Buytaert, Belgian computer programmer
- 1978 – Matt Dusk, Canadian singer
- 1978 – Věra Pospíšilová-Cechlová, Czech discus thrower and shot putter
- 1979 – Keith Buckley, American singer-songwriter
- 1979 – Mahé Drysdale, New Zealand rower
- 1979 – John-Ford Griffin, American baseball player
- 1979 – Ryan Howard, American baseball player
- 1979 – Barry Jenkins, American director, screenwriter, and producer
- 1979 – Larry Johnson, American football player
- 1979 – Leam Richardson, English footballer and manager
- 1980 – Courtney Anderson, American football player
- 1980 – Otis Grigsby, American football player
- 1980 – Vladimir Radmanović, Serbian basketball player
- 1981 – Marcus Banks, American basketball player
- 1981 – Juan Martín Fernández Lobbe, Argentine rugby player
- 1981 – André Lotterer, German race car driver
- 1981 – DJ Tukutz, South Korean DJ, producer, and songwriter
- 1981 – Mark Wallace, Welsh-English cricketer
- 1982 – Jonathan Sánchez, Puerto Rican baseball player
- 1983 – Chandra Crawford, Canadian skier
- 1983 – Adam Driver, American actor
- 1983 – Daria Werbowy, Polish-Canadian model
- 1984 – Jorge Fucile, Uruguayan footballer
- 1984 – Dawid Kucharski, Polish footballer
- 1984 – Brittany Maynard, American activist (died 2014)
- 1985 – Chris Eagles, English footballer
- 1985 – Alex Mack, American football player
- 1986 – Sam Betty, English rugby player
- 1986 – Jeannie Ortega, American singer-songwriter, dancer, and actress
- 1986 – Michael Saunders, Canadian baseball player
- 1986 – Jessicah Schipper, Australian swimmer
- 1986 – Milan Smiljanić, Serbian footballer
- 1987 – Sílvia Soler Espinosa, Spanish tennis player
- 1988 – Víctor Cuesta, Argentine footballer
- 1988 – Timo Eichfuss, Estonian basketball player
- 1988 – Patrick Kane, American ice hockey player
- 1989 – Kenneth Faried, American basketball player
- 1989 – John McCarthy, Australian footballer (died 2012)
- 1989 – Roman Sergeevich Trofimov, Russian ski jumper
- 1989 – Tyga, American rapper
- 1990 – Marquise Goodwin, American football player
- 1990 – Josh Lambo, American football and soccer player
- 1990 – John Moore, American ice hockey player
- 1990 – Benedikt Schmid, German footballer
- 1991 – Fabien Antunes, French footballer
- 1991 – Marina Marković, Serbian basketball player
- 1992 – Cameron Bancroft, Australian cricketer
- 1992 – Roland Baumann, Austrian politician
- 1992 – James Tarkowski, English footballer
- 1993 – Justin Anderson, American basketball player
- 1993 – Joey Gallo, American baseball player
- 1993 – Suso, Spanish footballer
- 1993 – Lawrence Vigouroux, Chilean footballer
- 1994 – Ibrahima Mbaye, Senegalese footballer
- 1995 – Vanessa Axente, Hungarian model
- 1996 – RiceGum, American YouTuber
- 1996 – FaZe Rug, American YouTuber
- 1996 – Fred Warner, American football player
- 1997 – Zach Collins, American basketball player
- 1997 – Kotonowaka Masahiro, Japanese sumo wrestler
- 1998 – Nahuel Ferraresi, Venezuelan footballer
- 1999 – Evgenia Medvedeva, Russian figure skater

== Deaths ==
=== Pre-1600 ===
- 496 – Pope Gelasius I
- 498 – Pope Anastasius II
- 930 – Yan Keqiu, Chinese chief strategist
- 1034 – Theodoric II, Margrave of Lower Lusatia (born c. 990)
- 1092 – Malik-Shah I, Seljuk Sultan (born 1055)
- 1267 – Pedro Gallego, Franciscan scholar
- 1288 – Rudolf I, Margrave of Baden-Baden (born 1230)
- 1298 – Mechtilde, Saxon saint (born c. 1240)
- 1350 – Raoul II of Brienne, Count of Eu (born 1315)
- 1481 – Anne de Mowbray, 8th Countess of Norfolk (born 1472)
- 1557 – Bona Sforza, Italian wife of Sigismund I the Old (born 1494)
- 1577 – Matsunaga Hisahide, Japanese daimyō (born 1508)
- 1581 – Tsarevich Ivan Ivanovich of Russia (born 1554)

=== 1601–1900 ===
- 1649 – Caspar Schoppe, German scholar and author (born 1576)
- 1665 – Nicolas Poussin, French-Italian painter (born 1594)
- 1672 – John Wilkins, English bishop and philosopher (born 1614)
- 1679 – Roger Conant, Massachusetts governor (born 1592)
- 1692 – Thomas Shadwell, English poet and playwright (born 1642)
- 1703 – Man in the Iron Mask, French prisoner
- 1723 – Antoine Nompar de Caumont, French courtier and soldier (born 1632)
- 1772 – William Nelson, American politician, Colonial Governor of Virginia (born 1711)
- 1773 – James FitzGerald, 1st Duke of Leinster, Irish soldier and politician (born 1722)
- 1785 – Bernard de Bury, French harpsichord player and composer (born 1720)
- 1798 – Wolfe Tone, executed Irish general (born 1763)
- 1804 – Pietro Alessandro Guglielmi, Italian composer (born 1728)
- 1810 – Jean-Georges Noverre, French dancer and choreographer (born 1727)
- 1822 – Johann Georg Tralles, German mathematician and physicist (born 1763)
- 1828 – Franz Schubert, Austrian pianist and composer (born 1797)
- 1831 – Titumir, Bengali revolutionary (born 1782)
- 1850 – Richard Mentor Johnson, American colonel, lawyer, and politician, 9th Vice President of the United States (born 1780)
- 1863 – William P. Sanders, American army officer (born 1833)
- 1865 – Lydia Brown, American missionary to the Hawaiian Kingdom (born 1780)
- 1868 – Ivane Andronikashvili, Georgian general (born 1798)
- 1883 – Carl Wilhelm Siemens, German-English engineer (born 1823)
- 1887 – Emma Lazarus, American poet (born 1849)
- 1897 – William Seymour Tyler, American historian and academic (born 1810)

=== 1901–present ===
- 1910 – Wilhelm Rudolph Fittig, German chemist (born 1835)
- 1915 – Joe Hill, Swedish-born American labor activist (born 1879)
- 1918 – Joseph F. Smith, American religious leader, 6th President of The Church of Jesus Christ of Latter-day Saints (born 1838)
- 1924 – Thomas H. Ince, American actor, director, producer, and screenwriter (born 1880)
- 1928 – Jeanne Bérangère, French actress (born 1864)
- 1931 – Xu Zhimo, Chinese poet and translator (born 1897)
- 1938 – Lev Shestov, Ukrainian-Russian philosopher and theologian (born 1866)
- 1942 – Bruno Schulz, Polish painter and critic (born 1892)
- 1943 – Miyagiyama Fukumatsu, Japanese sumo wrestler, the 29th Yokozuna (born 1895)
- 1949 – James Ensor, Belgian painter (born 1860)
- 1950 – Aage Redal, Danish actor (born 1891)
- 1954 – Walter Bartley Wilson, English footballer and manager (born 1870)
- 1955 – Marquis James, American journalist and author (born 1891)
- 1956 – Francis L. Sullivan, English-American actor (born 1903)
- 1959 – Joseph Charbonneau, Canadian archbishop (born 1892)
- 1960 – Phyllis Haver, American actress (born 1899)
- 1962 – Grigol Robakidze, Georgian author, poet, and playwright (born 1880)
- 1963 – Carmen Boni, Italian-French actress (born 1901)
- 1963 – Henry B. Richardson, American archer (born 1889)
- 1967 – Charles J. Watters, American priest and soldier, Medal of Honor recipient (born 1927)
- 1968 – May Hollinworth, Australian theatre producer and director (born 1895)
- 1970 – Lewis Sargent, American actor (born 1903)
- 1970 – Maria Yudina, Soviet pianist (born 1899)
- 1974 – George Brunies, American trombonist (born 1902)
- 1974 – Louise Fitzhugh, American author and illustrator (born 1928)
- 1975 – Roger D. Branigin, American colonel, lawyer, and politician, 42nd Governor of Indiana (born 1902)
- 1975 – Rudolf Kinau, German writer in Low German (born 1887)
- 1975 – Elizabeth Taylor, English novelist, (born 1912)
- 1976 – Basil Spence, Indian-Scottish architect and academic, designed the Coventry Cathedral (born 1907)
- 1983 – Tom Evans, English singer-songwriter and guitarist (born 1947)
- 1985 – Stepin Fetchit, American actor, singer, and dancer (born 1902)
- 1985 – Juan Arvizu, Mexican lyric opera tenor and bolero vocalist (born 1900)
- 1988 – Christina Onassis, American-Greek businesswoman (born 1950)
- 1988 – Peggy Parish, American author (born 1927)
- 1989 – Grant Adcox, American race car driver (born 1950)
- 1990 – Sun Li-jen, Chinese general and politician (born 1900)
- 1991 – Reggie Nalder, Austrian-American actor (born 1907)
- 1992 – Bobby Russell, American singer-songwriter (born 1940)
- 1992 – Diane Varsi, American actress (born 1938)
- 1998 – Ted Fujita, Japanese-American meteorologist and academic (born 1920)
- 1998 – Alan J. Pakula, American director, producer, and screenwriter (born 1928)
- 1998 – Bernard Thompson, English director and producer (born 1926)
- 1999 – Alexander Liberman, Russian-American artist and publisher (born 1912)
- 2001 – Marcelle Ferron, Canadian painter and stained glass artist (born 1924)
- 2003 – Ian Geoghegan, Australian race car driver (born 1939)
- 2004 – George Canseco, Filipino journalist and composer (born 1934)
- 2004 – Piet Esser, Dutch sculptor and academic (born 1914)
- 2004 – Helmut Griem, German actor and director (born 1932)
- 2004 – Trina Schart Hyman, American author and illustrator (born 1939)
- 2004 – Terry Melcher, American singer-songwriter and producer (born 1942)
- 2004 – John Vane, English pharmacologist and academic, Nobel Prize laureate (born 1927)
- 2005 – Erik Balling, Danish director, producer, and screenwriter (born 1924)
- 2005 – Steve Belichick, American football player, coach and scout (born 1919)
- 2007 – Kevin DuBrow, American singer-songwriter (born 1955)
- 2007 – Mike Gregory, English rugby player and coach (born 1964)
- 2009 – Johnny Delgado, Filipino actor (born 1948)
- 2010 – Pat Burns, Canadian ice hockey player and coach (born 1952)
- 2011 – Ömer Lütfi Akad, Turkish director and screenwriter (born 1916)
- 2011 – John Neville, English actor (born 1925)
- 2011 – Ruth Stone, American poet and author (born 1915)
- 2012 – John Hefin, Welsh director and producer (born 1941)
- 2012 – Shiro Miya, Japanese singer-songwriter (born 1943)
- 2012 – Warren Rudman, American lawyer and politician (born 1930)
- 2012 – Boris Strugatskiy, Russian author (born 1933)
- 2013 – Babe Birrer, American baseball player (born 1928)
- 2013 – Dora Dougherty Strother, American pilot and academic (born 1921)
- 2013 – Ray Gosling, English journalist, author, and activist (born 1939)
- 2013 – Frederick Sanger, English biochemist and academic, Nobel Prize laureate (born 1918)
- 2013 – Charlotte Zolotow, American author and poet (born 1915)
- 2014 – Roy Bhaskar, English philosopher and academic (born 1944)
- 2014 – Jeremiah Coffey, Irish-Australian bishop (born 1933)
- 2014 – Pete Harman, American businessman (born 1919)
- 2014 – Richard A. Jensen, American theologian, author, and academic (born 1934)
- 2014 – Gholam Hossein Mazloumi, Iranian footballer and manager (born 1950)
- 2014 – Mike Nichols, German-American actor, director, producer, and screenwriter (born 1931)
- 2015 – Armand, Dutch singer-songwriter (born 1946)
- 2015 – Allen E. Ertel, American lawyer and politician (born 1937)
- 2015 – Ron Hynes, Canadian singer-songwriter and guitarist (born 1950)
- 2015 – Korrie Layun Rampan, Indonesian author, poet, and critic (born 1953)
- 2015 – Mal Whitfield, American runner and diplomat (born 1924)
- 2017 – Charles Manson, American cult leader and mass murderer (born 1934)
- 2017 – Warren "Pete" Moore, American singer-songwriter and record producer (born 1938)
- 2017 – Jana Novotná, Czech tennis player (born 1968)
- 2017 – Della Reese, American singer and actress (born 1931)
- 2017 – Mel Tillis, American singer and songwriter (born 1932)
- 2022 – Jason David Frank, American actor and mixed martial artist (born 1973)
- 2023 – Rosalynn Carter, American mental health activist, First Lady of the United States (1977–1981), and of Georgia (1971–1975) (born 1927)
- 2023 – Eddie Linden, Scottish poet and publisher (born 1935)
- 2024 – Tony Campolo, American sociologist and pastor (born 1935)

== Holidays and observances ==
- Christian feast day:
  - Blessed Giacomo Benefatti
  - Mechthild of Hackeborn
  - Obadiah (Eastern Catholic Church)
  - Raphael Kalinowski
  - Severinus, Exuperius, and Felician
  - November 19 (Eastern Orthodox liturgics)
- Day of Discovery of Puerto Rico (Puerto Rico)
- Day of Missile Forces and Artillery (Russia, Belarus)
- Flag Day (Brazil)
- Garifuna Settlement Day (Belize)
- International Men's Day
- Liberation Day (Mali)
- Martyrs' Day (Uttar Pradesh, India)
- The Sovereign Prince's Day (Monaco)
- World Toilet Day
