= Mensch =

Yiddish word for a person of integrity and honor

Mensch or mentsh (Yiddish: מענטש) is a Yiddish word which literally translates to "person", and figuratively means "a person of integrity and honour". Jewish American humourist Leo Rosten describes a "mensh" as "someone to admire and emulate, someone of noble character. The key to being 'a real mensh' is nothing less than character, rectitude, dignity, a sense of what is right, responsible, decorous". The term is used as a high compliment, implying the rarity and value of that individual's qualities.

== Overview ==
The Yiddish mentsh developed alongside the Middle High German mensch, both derived from the Old High German mennisco. The spelling "mentsh" is used less frequently in English than "mensch", but the former is the standard transliteration recommended by the YIVO.

Mensch has migrated as a loanword into Yinglish and American English with the German spelling to refer not to a person, but a particularly good person, similar to a "stand-up guy": a person with the qualities one would hope for in a friend or trusted colleague. Mentshlekhkeyt (Yiddish: מענטשלעכקייט) likewise literally means "humanity" but can also refer to the properties which make a person a mensch.

The word mensch and the underlying concept have had an impact on popular culture. The Mensch on a Bench is a 2012 Hanukkah-themed book and doll set parodying The Elf on the Shelf. A life-size version of the doll was adopted as the mascot of Team Israel at the World Baseball Classic in 2016. According to pitcher Gabe Cramer, "The Mensch is a great way to have fun in the dugout while reminding us of why we're here and who we're representing".

== See also ==
- Gutmensch
- Kalos kagathos
- Moral idealist
- Übermensch
- Untermensch
- The Mensch on a Bench
- Jewish etiquette
