= November 7 =

November 7 this year in various calendars
- Saturday, 7 November 2026
Akan	Fomemene
Armenian	20 Trē 1476
Aztec	Atlcahualo 16, 3 Ātl
Babylonian	25 Tashritu, 2337 SE
Balinese pawukon	Menga, Pasah, Jaya, Pon, Tungleh, Saniscara of Sinta, Kala, Nohan, Manusa
Bengali	22 Kartik, BS 1433
Chinese	Yin Wood Rooster・Willow Mansion; Fire Horse Year, Month 9, Day 29 (Lidong, 15 days until Xiaoxue)
Common Era	7 November 2026 CE
Coptic	28 Paopi, AM 1743
Egyptian	25 Phamenoth, 2775 NE
Ethiopian	28 Ṭeqemt, 2019 Amätä Məhrät
French Republican	Décade II, Sextidi de Brumaire de l'Année 235 de la République
Gregorian	7 November, AD 2026
Hebrew	27 Cheshvan, AM 5787
Hindu	Citrā・Viṣkambha; Solar: 21 Kārtika, 1948 SE; Lunisolar: Trayodaśī, Kṛishna pakṣa of Āśvina, 2083 VE; Rāudra・5127 KY・1,872,886
Icelandic	Laugardagur, 15 Gormánuður 2026
Islamic	26 Jumada al-awwal, AH 1448 (using tabular method)
ISO week date	2026-W45-6
Japanese	28 Nagatsuki, Reiwa 8 (Rittō, 15 days until Shōsetsu)
Julian	25 October, AD 2026 (AM 7535)
Julian day	2461352
Korean	28 Gaedal, 4359 DE
Maya	13.0.14.1.9; 2 Ceh, 3 Muluc
Roman	ante diem VIII Kalendas Novembres, MMDCCLXXIX AUC
Solar Hijri	16 Aban, SH 1405
Tibetan	28 tha skar, me pho rta 2153 or 1772 or 1000

<<	November					>>
Su	Mo	Tu	We	Th	Fr	Sa
1	2	3	4	5	6	7
8	9	10	11	12	13	14
15	16	17	18	19	20	21
22	23	24	25	26	27	28
29	30
2026

November 7 in recent years
2026 (Saturday)
2025 (Friday)
2024 (Thursday)
2023 (Tuesday)
2022 (Monday)
2021 (Sunday)
2020 (Saturday)
2019 (Thursday)
2018 (Wednesday)
2017 (Tuesday)

November 7 is the 311th day of the year (312th in leap years) in the Gregorian calendar; 54 days remain until the end of the year.

== Events ==
=== Pre-1600 ===
- 335 – Athanasius, 20th pope of Alexandria, is banished to Trier on the charge that he prevented a grain fleet from sailing to Constantinople.
- 680 – The Sixth Ecumenical Council commences in Constantinople.
- 921 – Treaty of Bonn: The Frankish kings Charles the Simple and Henry the Fowler sign a peace treaty or 'pact of friendship' (amicitia) to recognize their borders along the Rhine.
- 1185 – The Byzantine army under Alexios Branas defeats the Norman army in the battle of Demetritzes and captures its leaders counts Baldwin and Richard of Acerra.
- 1426 – Lam Sơn uprising: Lam Sơn rebels emerge victorious against the Ming army in the Battle of Tốt Động – Chúc Động taking place in Đông Quan, in now Hanoi.
- 1492 – The Ensisheim meteorite, the oldest meteorite with a known date of impact, strikes the Earth in a wheat field outside the village of Ensisheim, Alsace, France.
- 1504 – Christopher Columbus returns from his fourth and last voyage.

=== 1601–1900 ===
- 1619 – Elizabeth Stuart is crowned Queen of Bohemia.
- 1659 – The Treaty of the Pyrenees put end to the Franco-Spanish War. The Principality of Catalonia is divided between Spain and France.
- 1665 – The London Gazette, the oldest surviving journal, is first published.
- 1723 – O Ewigkeit, du Donnerwort, BWV 60, a dialogue cantata by Johann Sebastian Bach for Leipzig, was first performed.
- 1775 – John Murray (also known as Lord Dunmore), the Royal Governor of the Colony of Virginia, starts the first mass emancipation of slaves in North America by issuing Lord Dunmore's Offer of Emancipation, which offers freedom to slaves who abandoned their colonial masters to fight with Murray and the British.
- 1786 – The oldest musical organization in the United States is founded as the Stoughton Musical Society.
- 1811 – Tecumseh's War: The Battle of Tippecanoe is fought near present-day Battle Ground, Indiana, United States.
- 1837 – In Alton, Illinois, abolitionist printer Elijah P. Lovejoy is shot dead by a mob while attempting to protect his printing shop from being destroyed a third time.
- 1861 – American Civil War: Battle of Belmont: In Belmont, Missouri, Union forces led by General Ulysses S. Grant overrun a Confederate camp but are forced to retreat when Confederate reinforcements arrive.
- 1861 – The first Melbourne Cup horse race is held in Melbourne, Australia.
- 1874 – A cartoon by Thomas Nast in Harper's Weekly, is considered the first important use of an elephant as a symbol for the United States Republican Party.
- 1881 – Mapuche uprising of 1881: Mapuche rebels destroy the Chilean settlement of Nueva Imperial after defenders fled to the hills.
- 1885 – The completion of Canada's first transcontinental railway is symbolized by the Last Spike ceremony at Craigellachie, British Columbia.
- 1893 – Women's suffrage: Women in the U.S. state of Colorado are granted the right to vote, the second state to do so.
- 1893 – An anarchist throws two bombs in Barcelona's Liceu opera house, killing 20.
- 1900 – Second Boer War: The Battle of Leliefontein takes place, during which the Royal Canadian Dragoons win three Victoria Crosses.

=== 1901–present ===
- 1907 – Jesús García saves the entire town of Nacozari de García by driving a burning train full of dynamite six kilometres (3.7 miles) away before it can explode.
- 1910 – The first air freight shipment (from Dayton, Ohio, to Columbus, Ohio) is undertaken by the Wright brothers and department store owner Max Morehouse.
- 1912 – The Deutsche Opernhaus (now Deutsche Oper Berlin) opens in the Berlin neighborhood of Charlottenburg, with a production of Beethoven's Fidelio.
- 1913 – The first day of the Great Lakes Storm of 1913, a massive blizzard that ultimately killed 250 and caused over $5 million (about $159,243,000 in 2024 dollars) damage. Winds reach hurricane force on this date.
- 1914 – The German colony of Kiaochow Bay and its centre at Tsingtao are captured by Japanese forces. This leaves Germany without a far east base.
- 1916 – Jeannette Rankin is the first woman elected to the United States Congress.
- 1916 – Woodrow Wilson is reelected as President of the United States.
- 1916 – Boston Elevated Railway Company's streetcar No. 393 smashes through the warning gates of the open Summer Street drawbridge in Boston, Massachusetts, plunging into the frigid waters of Fort Point Channel, killing 46 people.
- 1917 – The October Revolution, which gets its name from the Julian calendar date of 25 October, occurs, according to the Gregorian calendar; on this date, the Bolsheviks storm the Winter Palace.
- 1917 – World War I: The Third Battle of Gaza ends, with British forces capturing Gaza from the Ottoman Empire.
- 1918 – The 1918 influenza epidemic spreads to Western Samoa, killing 7,542 (about 20% of the population) by the end of the year.
- 1918 – Kurt Eisner overthrows the Wittelsbach dynasty in the Kingdom of Bavaria.
- 1919 – The first Palmer Raid is conducted on the second anniversary of the Russian Revolution. Over 10,000 suspected communists and anarchists are arrested in 23 U.S. cities.
- 1920 – Patriarch Tikhon of Moscow issues a decree that leads to the formation of the Russian Orthodox Church Outside Russia.
- 1929 – In New York City, the Museum of Modern Art opens to the public.
- 1931 – The Chinese Soviet Republic is proclaimed on the anniversary of the October Revolution.
- 1933 – Fiorello H. La Guardia is elected the 99th mayor of New York City.
- 1936 – Spanish Civil War: The Madrid Defense Council is formed to coordinate the Defense of Madrid against nationalist forces.
- 1940 – In Tacoma, Washington, the original Tacoma Narrows Bridge collapses in a windstorm, a mere four months after the bridge's completion.
- 1941 – World War II: Soviet hospital ship Armenia is sunk by German planes while evacuating refugees and wounded military and staff of several Crimean hospitals. It is estimated that over 5,000 people died in the sinking.
- 1944 – Soviet spy Richard Sorge, a half-Russian, half-German World War I veteran, is hanged by his Japanese captors along with 34 of his ring.
- 1944 – Franklin D. Roosevelt is elected for a record fourth term as President of the United States.
- 1949 – The first oil was taken in Oil Rocks (Neft Daşları), the world's oldest offshore oil platform.
- 1956 – Suez Crisis: The United Nations General Assembly adopts a resolution calling for the United Kingdom, France and Israel to immediately withdraw their troops from Egypt.
- 1956 – Hungarian Revolution: János Kádár returns to Budapest in a Soviet armored convoy, officially taking office as the next Hungarian leader. By this point, most armed resistance has been defeated.
- 1957 – Cold War: The Gaither Report calls for more American missiles and fallout shelters.
- 1967 – Carl B. Stokes is elected as Mayor of Cleveland, Ohio, becoming the first African American mayor of a major American city.
- 1967 – US President Lyndon B. Johnson signs the Public Broadcasting Act of 1967, establishing the Corporation for Public Broadcasting.
- 1972 – United States presidential election: U.S. President Richard Nixon is re-elected in the largest landslide victory at the time.
- 1973 – The United States Congress overrides President Richard Nixon's veto of the War Powers Resolution, which limits presidential power to wage war without congressional approval.
- 1975 – In Bangladesh, a joint force of people and soldiers takes part in an uprising led by Colonel Abu Taher that ousts and kills Brigadier Khaled Mosharraf, freeing the then house-arrested army chief and future president Major General Ziaur Rahman.
- 1982 – Colonel Saye Zerbo, president of the military government of Upper Volta, is ousted from power in a coup d'état led by Colonel Gabriel Yoryan Somé.
- 1983 – United States Senate bombing: A bomb explodes inside the United States Capitol. No one is injured, but an estimated $250,000 in damage is caused.
- 1983 – Cold War: The command post exercise Able Archer 83 begins, eventually leading to the Soviet Union to place air units in East Germany and Poland on alert, for fear that NATO was preparing for war
- 1987 – In Tunisia, president Habib Bourguiba is overthrown and replaced by Prime Minister Zine El Abidine Ben Ali.
- 1987 – The Mass Rapid Transit (MRT) system in Singapore opens for passenger service.
- 1989 – Douglas Wilder wins the governor's seat in Virginia, becoming the first elected African American governor in the United States.
- 1989 – David Dinkins becomes the first African American to be elected Mayor of New York City.
- 1989 – East German Prime Minister Willi Stoph, along with his entire cabinet, is forced to resign after huge anti-government protests.
- 1990 – Mary Robinson becomes the first woman to be elected President of the Republic of Ireland.
- 1991 – Magic Johnson announces that he is HIV-positive and retires from the NBA.
- 1994 – WXYC, the student radio station of the University of North Carolina at Chapel Hill, launches the world's first internet radio broadcast.
- 1996 – NASA launches the Mars Global Surveyor.
- 1996 – ADC Airlines Flight 086 crashes into the Lagos Lagoon in Epe, Lagos State, Nigeria, killing all 144 people on board.
- 2000 – The controversial US presidential election is later resolved in the Bush v. Gore Supreme Court case, electing George W. Bush as the 43rd President of the United States.
- 2000 – The U.S. Drug Enforcement Administration discovers one of the country's largest LSD labs inside a converted military missile silo in Wamego, Kansas.
- 2004 – Iraq War: The interim government of Iraq calls for a 60-day state of emergency as U.S. forces storm the insurgent stronghold of Fallujah.
- 2007 – The Jokela school shooting in Jokela, Tuusula, Finland, takes place, resulting in the death of nine people.
- 2012 – An earthquake off the Pacific coast of Guatemala kills at least 52 people.
- 2017 – Shamshad TV is attacked by gunmen and suicide bombers, with a security guard killed and 20 people wounded; ISIS claims responsibility for the attack.
- 2020 – Joe Biden is confirmed elected as the 46th president of the United States, defeating incumbent Donald Trump.
- 2023 – António Costa resigns as Prime Minister of Portugal following news of an investigation in a corruption scandal implicating members of his cabinet.
- 2026 – A shooting took place in the Main Market Square in Kraków. At least 5 people were killed, and 15 were injured.

== Births ==
=== Pre-1600 ===
- 630 – Constans II, Byzantine emperor (died 668)
- 994 – Ibn Hazm, Arabian philosopher and scholar (died 1069)
- 1186 – Ögedei Khan, Mongol ruler, 2nd Great Khan of the Mongol Empire (died 1241)
- 1316 – Simeon of Russia (died 1353)
- 1456 – Margaret of Bavaria, Electress Palatine, Princess of Bavaria-Landshut by birth (died 1501)
- 1525 – Georg Cracow, German lawyer and politician (died 1575)
- 1598 – Francisco de Zurbarán, Spanish painter (died 1664)

=== 1601–1900 ===
- 1619 – Gédéon Tallemant des Réaux, French author and poet (died 1692)
- 1650 – John Robinson, English bishop and diplomat (died 1723)
- 1683 – Anton thor Helle, German-Estonian clergyman, author, and translator (died 1748)
- 1687 – William Stukeley, English archaeologist and physician (died 1765)
- 1706 – Carlo Cecere, Italian violinist and composer (died 1761)
- 1728 – James Cook, English captain, navigator, and cartographer (died 1779)
- 1750 – Friedrich Leopold zu Stolberg-Stolberg, German poet and lawyer (died 1819)
- 1787 – Carl Carl, Polish-born actor and theatre director (died 1854)
- 1789 – Alfred Kelley, American legislator, canal builder, and railroad magnate (died 1859)
- 1800 – Platt Rogers Spencer, American calligrapher and educator (died 1864)
- 1805 – Thomas Brassey, English engineer and businessman (died 1870)
- 1818 – Emil du Bois-Reymond, German physician and physiologist (died 1896)
- 1821 – Andrea Debono, Maltese trader and explorer (died 1871)
- 1830 – Emanuele Luigi Galizia, Maltese architect and civil engineer (died 1907)
- 1832 – Andrew Dickson White, American historian, academic, and diplomat, co-founded Cornell University (died 1918)
- 1838 – Auguste Villiers de l'Isle-Adam, French author and playwright (died 1889)
- 1843 – William Plankinton, American businessman, industrialist and banker (died 1905)
- 1846 – Ignaz Brüll, Austrian pianist and composer (died 1907)
- 1851 – Chris von der Ahe, German-American businessman (died 1913)
- 1858 – Bipin Chandra Pal, Indian academic and activist (died 1932)
- 1860 – Jean Baptiste Eugène Estienne, French general and engineer (died 1936)
- 1860 – Paul Peel, Canadian painter and academic (died 1892)
- 1861 – Jeff Milton, American police officer (died 1947)
- 1861 – Lesser Ury, German painter (died 1931)
- 1867 – Marie Curie, Polish chemist and physicist, Nobel Prize laureate (died 1934)
- 1872 – Lucille La Verne, American actress (died 1945)
- 1872 – Leonora Speyer, American poet and violinist (died 1956)
- 1876 – Charlie Townsend, English cricketer and lawyer (died 1958)
- 1878 – Lise Meitner, Austrian-Swedish physicist and academic (died 1968)
- 1879 – King Baggot, American actor, director, and screenwriter (died 1948)
- 1879 – Leon Trotsky, Russian theorist and politician, founded the Red Army (died 1940)
- 1886 – Aron Nimzowitsch, Russian-Danish chess player and theoretician (died 1935)
- 1888 – C. V. Raman, Indian physicist and academic, Nobel Prize laureate (died 1970)
- 1888 – Nestor Makhno, Ukrainian anarchist revolutionary (died 1934)
- 1890 – Jan Matulka, Czech-American painter and illustrator (died 1972)
- 1891 – Genrikh Yagoda, director of the NKVD (died 1938)
- 1893 – Leatrice Joy, American actress (died 1985)
- 1893 – Margaret Leech, American historian and author (died 1974)
- 1896 – Esdras Minville, Canadian economist and sociologist (died 1975)
- 1897 – Herman J. Mankiewicz, American director, producer, and screenwriter (died 1953)
- 1897 – Armstrong Sperry, American author and illustrator (died 1976)
- 1898 – Margaret Morris, American actress (died 1968)
- 1898 – Raphaël Salem, Greek-French mathematician and academic (died 1963)
- 1899 – Yitzhak Lamdan, Russian-Israeli journalist and poet (died 1954)
- 1900 – Nellie Campobello, Mexican writer who chronicled the Mexican Revolution (died 1986)

=== 1901–present ===
- 1901 – Norah McGuinness, Irish painter and illustrator (died 1980)
- 1903 – Ary Barroso, Brazilian pianist and composer (died 1964)
- 1903 – Dean Jagger, American actor (died 1991)
- 1903 – Konrad Lorenz, Austrian zoologist, ethologist, and ornithologist, Nobel Prize laureate (died 1989)
- 1905 – William Alwyn, English composer, conductor, and educator (died 1985)
- 1906 – Eugene Carson Blake, American minister and educator (died 1985)
- 1908 – Marijac, French author and illustrator (died 1994)
- 1909 – Ruby Hurley, American civil rights activist (died 1980)
- 1909 – Norman Krasna, American director, producer, screenwriter, and playwright (died 1984)
- 1912 – Victor Beaumont, English actor (died 1977)
- 1913 – Albert Camus, French novelist, philosopher, and journalist, Nobel Prize laureate (died 1960)
- 1913 – Alekos Sakellarios, Greek director and screenwriter (died 1991)
- 1913 – Mikhail Solomentsev, Soviet politician, member of the Politburo of the Central Committee of the Communist Party of the Soviet Union (died 2008)
- 1914 – Archie Campbell, American actor, singer, and screenwriter (died 1987)
- 1914 – R. A. Lafferty, American author (died 2002)
- 1915 – Philip Morrison, American astrophysicist and academic (died 2005)
- 1915 – M. Athalie Range, American activist and politician (died 2006)
- 1917 – Titos Vandis, Greek actor (died 2003)
- 1918 – Paul Aussaresses, French general (died 2013)
- 1918 – Billy Graham, American minister and author (died 2018)
- 1918 – Maria Teresa de Noronha, Portuguese singer (died 1993)
- 1919 – Ellen Stewart, American director and producer (died 2011)
- 1920 – Max Kampelman, American lawyer and diplomat (died 2013)
- 1920 – Elaine Morgan, Welsh writer, aquatic ape hypothesis (died 2013)
- 1921 – Lisa Ben, American singer-songwriter and journalist (died 2015)
- 1921 – Jack Fleck, American golfer (died 2014)
- 1921 – Susanne Hirzel, member of the White Rose (died 2012)
- 1922 – Ghulam Azam, Bangladeshi politician (died 2014)
- 1922 – Al Hirt, American trumpet player and bandleader (died 1999)
- 1923 – Gene Callahan, American art director and production designer (died 1990)
- 1926 – Joan Sutherland, Australian soprano (died 2010)
- 1927 – Herbert Flam, American tennis player (died 1980)
- 1927 – Hiroshi Yamauchi, Japanese businessman (died 2013)
- 1928 – Richard G. Scott, American engineer and religious leader (died 2015)
- 1929 – Jesús de Polanco, Spanish publisher and businessman (died 2007)
- 1929 – Eric Kandel, Austrian-American neuroscientist and psychiatrist, Nobel Prize laureate
- 1929 – Lila Kaye, English actress (died 2012)
- 1930 – Rudy Boschwitz, German-American politician
- 1931 – G. Edward Griffin, American director, producer, and author
- 1935 – Lubomír Beneš, Czech animator, producer and author (died 1995)
- 1935 – W. S. Rendra, Indonesian poet and playwright (died 2009)
- 1936 – Al Attles, American basketball player and coach (died 2024)
- 1936 – Gwyneth Jones, Welsh soprano
- 1937 – Mary Daheim, American journalist and author (died 2022)
- 1938 – Dee Clark, American singer-songwriter (died 1990)
- 1938 – Jake Gibbs, American baseball player and coach
- 1938 – Jim Kaat, American baseball player, coach, and sportscaster
- 1938 – Barry Newman, American actor (died 2023)
- 1939 – Barbara Liskov, American computer scientist and academic
- 1940 – Dakin Matthews, American actor, director, and playwright
- 1940 – Antonio Skármeta, Chilean author and academic (died 2024)
- 1941 – Madeline Gins, American poet and architect (died 2014)
- 1941 – Angelo Scola, Italian cardinal and philosopher
- 1942 – Tom Peters, American businessman and author
- 1942 – Johnny Rivers, American singer-songwriter, guitarist, and producer
- 1942 – Jean Shrimpton, English model and actress
- 1943 – Silvia Cartwright, New Zealand lawyer, judge, and politician, 18th Governor-General of New Zealand
- 1943 – Stephen Greenblatt, American theorist, scholar, and critic
- 1943 – Boris Gromov, Russian general and politician, Governor of Moscow Oblast
- 1943 – Joni Mitchell, Canadian singer-songwriter and guitarist
- 1943 – Michael Spence, American economist and academic, Nobel Prize laureate
- 1944 – Gigi Riva, Italian footballer and manager (died 2024)
- 1944 – Peter Wilby, English journalist
- 1944 – Pekka Vennamo, Finnish politician (died 2026)
- 1945 – Joe Niekro, American baseball player (died 2006)
- 1946 – Chrystos, American writer and activist
- 1947 – Bob Anderson, English darts player
- 1947 – Rebecca Eaton, American television producer
- 1947 – Yutaka Fukumoto, Japanese baseball player and coach
- 1947 – Ron Leavitt, American screenwriter and producer (died 2008)
- 1947 – Sondhi Limthongkul, Thai journalist and politician
- 1948 – Stephen Green, Baron Green of Hurstpierpoint, English businessman and politician
- 1948 – Buck Martinez, American baseball player and manager
- 1948 – Alex Ribeiro, Brazilian race car driver
- 1949 – Stephen Bruton, American guitarist, songwriter, and producer (died 2009)
- 1949 – Steven Stucky, American composer and academic (died 2016)
- 1949 – David S. Ware, American saxophonist, composer, and bandleader (died 2012)
- 1950 – Lindsay Duncan, Scottish actress
- 1950 – John Lang, Australian rugby league player and coach
- 1951 – Gerard F. Gilmore, New Zealand astronomer and academic
- 1951 – Kevin MacMichael, Canadian guitarist, songwriter, and record producer (died 2002)
- 1951 – Lawrence O'Donnell, American journalist and talk show host
- 1951 – John Tamargo, American baseball player and coach
- 1952 – David Petraeus, American general, Director of the Central Intelligence Agency
- 1952 – Modibo Sidibé, Sudanese–Malian police officer and politician, Prime Minister of Mali
- 1952 – Valeriy Zuyev, Ukrainian footballer and manager (died 2016)
- 1953 – Maire Aunaste, Estonian journalist and author
- 1953 – Erik Balke, Norwegian saxophonist and composer
- 1953 – Christopher Foster, English bishop
- 1953 – Lucinda Green, English equestrian and journalist
- 1954 – James Gray, Scottish politician
- 1954 – Kamal Haasan, Tamil actor, director, producer, and screenwriter
- 1954 – Guy Gavriel Kay, Canadian lawyer and author
- 1954 – Gil Junger, American director, producer, and screenwriter
- 1955 – Shirley Eikhard, Canadian Juno Award-winning singer-songwriter (Something to Talk About)
- 1956 – Mikhail Alperin, Ukrainian pianist and composer (died 2018)
- 1956 – Jonathan Palmer, English race car driver and businessman
- 1956 – Judy Tenuta, American comedian, actress, and comedy musician (died 2022)
- 1957 – John Benitez, American DJ, songwriter, and producer
- 1957 – King Kong Bundy, American wrestler (died 2019)
- 1957 – Christopher Knight, American actor
- 1958 – Dmitry Kozak, Russian politician; Deputy Prime Minister of the Russian Federation
- 1959 – Billy Gillispie, American basketball player and coach
- 1959 – Alexandre Guimarães, Brazilian-Costa Rican footballer and manager
- 1960 – Tommy Thayer, American guitarist and songwriter
- 1960 – Shyamaprasad, Indian filmmaker
- 1961 – Orlando Mercado, American baseball player and coach
- 1962 – Tracie Savage, American actress and journalist
- 1962 – Dirk Shafer, American model, actor, and director (died 2015)
- 1963 – John Barnes, Jamaican-English footballer and manager
- 1963 – Sam Graves, American farmer and politician
- 1964 – Troy Beyer, American actress, director, and screenwriter
- 1964 – Philip Hollobone, English politician
- 1964 – Liam Ó Maonlaí, Irish keyboard player and songwriter
- 1964 – Dana Plato, American actress (died 1999)
- 1964 – Bonnie St. John, American skier and scholar
- 1965 – Steve Parkin, English footballer and manager
- 1965 – Sigrun Wodars, German runner and physiotherapist
- 1965 – Francis Takirwa, Ugandan general (died 2026)
- 1966 – Calvin Borel, American jockey
- 1967 – Steve Di Giorgio, American bass player
- 1967 – David Guetta, French DJ, record producer, remixer, and songwriter
- 1967 – Hikaru Ijūin, Japanese radio host
- 1967 – Rafael Herbert Reyes, Dominican wrestler
- 1967 – Sharleen Spiteri, Scottish singer-songwriter and actress
- 1968 – Russ Springer, American baseball player
- 1969 – Michelle Clunie, American actress
- 1969 – Hélène Grimaud, French pianist
- 1969 – Michel Picard, Canadian ice hockey player and scout
- 1970 – Andy Houston, American race car driver
- 1970 – Marc Rosset, Swiss-Monacan tennis player
- 1970 – Morgan Spurlock, American director, producer, and screenwriter (died 2024)
- 1970 – Paul Ware, English footballer (died 2013)
- 1971 – Robin Finck, American guitarist and songwriter
- 1971 – Matthew Ryan, American singer-songwriter and guitarist
- 1971 – Trivikram Srinivas, Indian director and screenwriter
- 1972 – Danny Grewcock, English rugby player
- 1972 – Jason London, American actor and producer
- 1972 – Jeremy London, American actor and producer
- 1972 – Hasim Rahman, American boxer
- 1972 – Marcus Stewart, English footballer and coach
- 1973 – Catê, Brazilian footballer and manager (died 2011)
- 1973 – Yunjin Kim, South Korean-American actress
- 1973 – Martín Palermo, Argentinian footballer and manager
- 1974 – Kris Benson, American baseball player
- 1974 – Brigitte Foster-Hylton, Jamaican hurdler
- 1974 – Christian Gómez, Argentinian footballer
- 1974 – Chris Summers, Norwegian drummer
- 1975 – Venkat Prabhu, Indian actor, director, and screenwriter
- 1976 – Rob Caggiano, American guitarist and producer
- 1976 – Mark Philippoussis, Australian tennis player and model
- 1977 – Lindsay Czarniak, American journalist and sportscaster
- 1977 – Andres Oper, Estonian footballer
- 1977 – María Sánchez Lorenzo, Spanish tennis player
- 1977 – Anthony Thomas, American football player and coach
- 1978 – Mohamed Aboutrika, Egyptian footballer
- 1978 – Elisabeth Bachman, American volleyball player and coach
- 1978 – Rio Ferdinand, English footballer
- 1978 – Tomoya Nagase, Japanese singer-songwriter
- 1978 – Barry Robson, Scottish footballer
- 1978 – Jan Vennegoor of Hesselink, Dutch footballer
- 1979 – Mike Commodore, Canadian ice hockey player
- 1979 – Will Demps, American football player
- 1979 – Danny Fonseca, Costa Rican footballer
- 1979 – Barney Harwood, English television host and actor
- 1979 – Jon Peter Lewis, American singer-songwriter and actor
- 1979 – Amy Purdy, American actress, model and snowboarder
- 1979 – Joey Ryan, American wrestler
- 1979 – Otep Shamaya, American singer-songwriter and actress
- 1980 – Sergio Almirón, Argentinian footballer
- 1980 – Gervasio Deferr, Spanish gymnast
- 1980 – James Franklin, New Zealand cricketer
- 1980 – Karthik, Indian singer-songwriter
- 1980 – Luciana Salazar, Argentinian model, actress, and singer
- 1981 – Muhammad Hassan, American wrestler and educator
- 1981 – Nana Katase, Japanese model, actress, and singer
- 1981 – Anushka Shetty, Indian actress
- 1981 – Rina Uchiyama, Japanese actress and model
- 1982 – Pascal Leclaire, Canadian ice hockey player
- 1983 – Adam DeVine, American actor, comedian, screenwriter, producer, and singer
- 1983 – Forrest Kline, American singer-songwriter and guitarist
- 1983 – Patrick Thoresen, Norwegian ice hockey player
- 1983 – Esmerling Vásquez, Dominican baseball player
- 1984 – Mihkel Aksalu, Estonian footballer
- 1984 – Jonathan Bornstein, American-Israeli soccer player
- 1984 – Gervais Randrianarisoa, Malagasy footballer
- 1984 – Amelia Vega, Dominican actress and singer, Miss Universe 2003
- 1985 – Sebastian Aldén, Swedish motorcycle racer
- 1985 – Darnell Jackson, American basketball player
- 1985 – Lucas Neff, American actor
- 1986 – Andy Hull, American singer-songwriter and guitarist
- 1986 – David Nelson, American football player
- 1986 – Doukissa Nomikou, Greek model and television host
- 1987 – Mitch Brown, Australian rugby league player
- 1987 – Marek Semjan, Slovak tennis player
- 1988 – Alexandr Dolgopolov, Ukrainian tennis player
- 1988 – Simone Favaro, Italian rugby player
- 1988 – Gani Lawal, Nigerian-American basketball player
- 1988 – Thomas Schneider, German sprinter
- 1988 – Tinie Tempah, English rapper and producer
- 1989 – Sonny Gray, American baseball player
- 1989 – Nadezhda Tolokonnikova, Russian singer and political activist
- 1990 – Daniel Ayala, Spanish footballer
- 1990 – Matt Corby, Australian singer-songwriter and guitarist
- 1990 – David de Gea, Spanish footballer
- 1990 – Joelle Hadjia, Australian singer-songwriter
- 1991 – Felix Rosenqvist, Swedish race car driver
- 1992 – Apisai Koroisau, Australian-Fijian rugby league player
- 1994 – Gervonta Davis, American boxer
- 1994 – Haruna Iikubo, Japanese singer and actress
- 1994 – Algee Smith, American actor and singer
- 1995 – Cody Ware, American racer car driver
- 1996 – Lorde, New Zealand singer-songwriter
- 1997 – Erika Hendsel, Estonian tennis player
- 1997 – Nana Okada, Japanese singer
- 1998 – Hongjoong, South Korean rapper, singer, producer, and songwriter
- 1998 – Trevor Rainbolt, American social media personality
- 1999 – Mink Nutcharut, Thai snooker player
- 2000 – Callum Hudson-Odoi, English footballer
- 2001 – Amybeth McNulty, Irish actress

== Deaths ==
=== Pre-1600 ===
- 691 – Cen Changqian, official of the Tang dynasty
- 691 – Ge Fuyuan, official of the Tang dynasty
- 927 – Zhu Shouyin, general of Later Tang
- 1173 – Uijong of Goryeo, Korean monarch of the Goryeo dynasty (born 1127)
- 1225 – Engelbert II of Berg, German archbishop and saint (born 1186)
- 1497 – Philip II, Duke of Savoy (born 1443)
- 1550 – Jón Arason, Icelandic bishop and poet (born 1484)
- 1561 – Jeanne de Jussie, Swiss nun and writer (born 1503)
- 1562 – Maldeo Rathore, Rao of Marwar (born 1511)
- 1574 – Solomon Luria, Polish rabbi and educator (born 1510)
- 1581 – Richard Davies, Welsh bishop and scholar (born 1505)
- 1599 – Gasparo Tagliacozzi, Italian surgeon and educator (born 1546)

=== 1601–1900 ===
- 1627 – Jahangir, Mughal emperor (born 1569)
- 1633 – Cornelis Drebbel, Dutch inventor (born 1572)
- 1639 – Thomas Arundell, 1st Baron Arundell of Wardour, English politician (born 1560)
- 1642 – Henry Montagu, 1st Earl of Manchester, English judge and politician, Lord High Treasurer of The United Kingdom (born 1563)
- 1652 – Henry of Nassau-Siegen, German count, officer in the Dutch Army, diplomat for the Dutch Republic (born 1611)
- 1713 – Elizabeth Barry, English actress (born 1658)
- 1809 – Paul Sandby, English painter and cartographer (born 1725)
- 1837 – Elijah Parish Lovejoy, American minister and journalist (born 1809)
- 1862 – Bahadur Shah II, Mughal emperor (born 1775)
- 1872 – Alfred Clebsch, German mathematician and academic (born 1833)
- 1881 – John MacHale, Irish archbishop (born 1791)

=== 1901–present ===
- 1906 – Heinrich Seidel, German engineer and poet (born 1842)
- 1907 – Jesús García, Mexican railroad brakeman (born 1881)
- 1913 – Alfred Russel Wallace, Welsh-English biologist and geographer (born 1823)
- 1916 – Henry Ward Ranger, American painter and academic (born 1858)
- 1919 – Hugo Haase, German lawyer, jurist, and politician (born 1863)
- 1922 – Sam Thompson, American baseball player (born 1860)
- 1923 – Ashwini Kumar Dutta, Indian educator and philanthropist (born 1856)
- 1930 – Ōkido Moriemon, Japanese sumo wrestler, the 23rd Yokozuna (born 1878)
- 1933 – Harold Weber, American golfer and architect (born 1882)
- 1941 – Frank Pick, English lawyer and businessman (born 1878)
- 1944 – Richard Sorge, Azerbaijani-German journalist and spy (born 1895)
- 1944 – Hannah Szenes, Hungarian-Israeli soldier and poet (born 1921)
- 1947 – K. Natesa Iyer, Indian-Sri Lankan journalist and politician (born 1887)
- 1959 – Victor McLaglen, English-American boxer and actor (born 1883)
- 1962 – Eleanor Roosevelt, American humanitarian and politician, 39th First Lady of the United States (born 1884)
- 1964 – Hans von Euler-Chelpin, German-Swedish biochemist and academic, Nobel Prize laureate (born 1863)
- 1966 – Rube Bressler, American baseball player (born 1894)
- 1967 – John Nance Garner, American lawyer and politician, 32nd Vice President of the United States (born 1868)
- 1968 – Gordon Coventry, Australian footballer and coach (born 1901)
- 1968 – Alexander Gelfond, Russian mathematician, cryptographer, and academic (born 1906)
- 1974 – Eric Linklater, Welsh-Scottish author and academic (born 1899)
- 1975 – Piero Dusio, Italian footballer, businessman and race car driver (born 1899)
- 1978 – Jivraj Narayan Mehta, Indian surgeon and politician, 6th Chief Minister of Gujarat (born 1887)
- 1978 – Gene Tunney, American boxer and actor (born 1897)
- 1979 – Frank O'Connor, American actor, rancher, and painter
- 1980 – İlhan Erdost, Turkish publisher (born 1944)
- 1980 – Steve McQueen, American actor and producer (born 1930)
- 1981 – Will Durant, American historian and philosopher (born 1885)
- 1983 – Germaine Tailleferre, French pianist and composer (born 1892)
- 1986 – Tracy Pew, Australian bass player (born 1957)
- 1988 – Bill Hoest, American cartoonist (born 1926)
- 1990 – Lawrence Durrell, British novelist, poet, dramatist, (born 1912)
- 1990 – Tom Clancy, Irish singer and actor, (born 1924)
- 1991 – Tom of Finland, Finnish illustrator (born 1920)
- 1991 – Nuri Ja'far, Iraqi psychologist and philosopher of education, (born 1914)
- 1992 – Alexander Dubček, Slovak soldier and politician (born 1921)
- 1992 – Jack Kelly, American actor and politician (born 1927)
- 1993 – Adelaide Hall, American-English singer, actress, and dancer (born 1901)
- 1993 – Charles Aidman, American stage, film, and television actor (born 1925)
- 1994 – Shorty Rogers, American trumpet player and composer (born 1924)
- 1995 – Ann Dunham, American anthropologist and academic (born 1942)
- 1996 – Claude Ake, Nigerian political scientist and academic (born 1939)
- 1996 – Jaja Wachuku, Nigerian lawyer and politician, Nigerian Minister of Foreign Affairs (born 1918)
- 2000 – Ingrid of Sweden (born 1910)
- 2000 – Nimalan Soundaranayagam, Sri Lankan educator and politician (born 1950)
- 2000 – Chidambaram Subramaniam, Indian publisher and politician, Indian Minister of Defence (born 1910)
- 2001 – Nida Blanca, Filipino actress (born 1936)
- 2001 – Anthony Shaffer, English author and playwright (born 1926)
- 2002 – Rudolf Augstein, German journalist, co-founded Der Spiegel (born 1923)
- 2003 – Foo Foo Lammar, British drag queen and nightclub owner (born 1937)
- 2004 – Howard Keel, American actor and singer (born 1919)
- 2005 – Harry Thompson, English author, screenwriter, and producer (born 1960)
- 2006 – Aino Kukk, Estonian chess player and engineer (born 1930)
- 2006 – Bryan Pata, American football player (born 1984)
- 2006 – Johnny Sain, American baseball player and coach (born 1917)
- 2006 – Jean-Jacques Servan-Schreiber, French journalist and politician, co-founded L'Express (born 1924)
- 2006 – Polly Umrigar, Indian cricketer and manager (born 1926)
- 2007 – Earl Dodge, American activist and politician (born 1932)
- 2007 – George W. George, American screenwriter and producer (born 1920)
- 2009 – Juanita Helms, American politician (born 1941)
- 2011 – Joe Frazier, American boxer (born 1944)
- 2011 – Takanosato Toshihide, Japanese sumo wrestler (born 1952)
- 2012 – Carmen Basilio, American boxer (born 1927)
- 2012 – Kevin O'Donnell, Jr., American author (born 1950)
- 2012 – Glenys Page, New Zealand cricketer (born 1940)
- 2012 – Sandy Pearson, Australian general (born 1918)
- 2012 – Darrell Royal, American football player and coach (born 1924)
- 2012 – Arthur K. Snyder, American lawyer and politician (born 1932)
- 2013 – John Cole, Irish-English journalist and author (born 1927)
- 2013 – Ian Davies, Australian basketball player and coach (born 1956)
- 2013 – Ron Dellow, English footballer and manager (born 1914)
- 2013 – Joey Manley, American publisher, founded Modern Tales (born 1965)
- 2013 – Jack Mitchell, American photographer and author (born 1925)
- 2013 – Manfred Rommel, German lawyer and politician (born 1928)
- 2014 – Lincoln D. Faurer, American general (born 1928)
- 2014 – Kajetan Kovič, Slovenian journalist and poet (born 1931)
- 2014 – Allen Ripley, American baseball player (born 1952)
- 2015 – Bappaditya Bandopadhyay, Indian director and poet (born 1970)
- 2015 – Ri Ul-sol, North Korean marshal and politician (born 1921)
- 2016 – Leonard Cohen, Canadian singer-songwriter and poet (born 1934)
- 2016 – Janet Reno, American lawyer and government official; Attorney General of the United States (1993–2001) (born 1938)
- 2016 – Jimmy Young, British singer and radio personality (born 1921)
- 2017 – Roy Halladay, American baseball player (born 1977)
- 2017 – Carl Sargeant, Welsh Assembly minister (born 1968)
- 2017 – James R. Thompson Jr., American naval officer and engineer, 5th Director of NASA Marshall Space Flight Center (born 1936)
- 2019 – Janette Sherman, American physician, author, and pioneer in occupational and environmental health (born 1930)
- 2020 – Jonathan Sacks, former Chief Rabbi of the Commonwealth and member of the House of Lords (born 1948)
- 2021 – Dean Stockwell, American actor (born 1936)
- 2023 – Frank Borman, American astronaut (born 1928)
- 2024 – Bruce Degen, American writer (born 1945)

== Holidays and observances ==
- Christian feast day:
  - All Dominican Saints and Blesseds
  - Bartholomäus Ziegenbalg (Lutheran)
  - Engelbert II of Berg
  - Herculanus of Perugia
  - John Christian Frederick Heyer (Lutheran)
  - Ludwig Ingwer Nommensen (Lutheran)
  - Peter Wu Guosheng
  - Prosdocimus
  - Vicente Liem de la Paz (one of Vietnamese Martyrs)
  - Willibrord
  - November 7 (Eastern Orthodox liturgics)
- Students' Day, the anniversary of B. R. Ambedkar's school entry day. (Maharashtra, India)
- Commemoration Day, the anniversary of Ben Ali's succession. (Tunisia)
- Hungarian Opera Day (Hungary)
- International Inuit Day
- National Day, after Treaty of the Pyrenees. (Northern Catalonia, France)
- National Revolution and Solidarity Day (Bangladesh)
- October Revolution Day (the Soviet Union (former, official), modern Belarus, Kyrgyzstan)
- Tokhu Emong (Lotha Naga people of India)
