= The Elf on the Shelf =

2005 children's picture book

- Author: Carol Aebersold; Chanda Bell
- Illustrator: Coë Steinwart
- Publisher: The Lumistella Company
- Publication date: 2005
- Publication place: United States
- ISBN: 0-976-99070-9
- Website: elfontheshelf.com

The Elf on the Shelf is a 2005 children's book written by Carol Aebersold and her daughter Chanda Bell. Based on a Christmas tradition that started in Aebersold's family when she was a child, it describes the role of an elf who is assigned by Santa Claus to monitor children's behavior. The book is packaged with a toy elf, and families are encouraged to name it and act as if it is genuinely watching them. Since its introduction, The Elf on the Shelf has become part of Christmas festivities in North America.

== Plot ==
The narrative of the book is presented from the viewpoint of an elf sent by Santa Claus to children's homes to observe their behavior during the holiday season. Upon receiving a name, the elf is endowed with Christmas magic. Each night, after the children have gone to bed, the elf flies to the North Pole and reports to Santa on the day's events, helping Santa to determine if the children are naughty or nice. Before the children awaken, the elf returns and assumes a new position within the household, engaging the family in a game of hide and seek. While children are not permitted to touch the elf, as doing so would compromise its magic, they are encouraged to share their Christmas wishes with it. On Christmas Eve, the elf's mission is complete, and it remains at the North Pole until the next season. The book concludes with a page designated for families to document their elf's name and the date of its adoption.

== History of publication ==
The Elf on the Shelf was written in 2004 by Carol Aebersold and her daughter Chanda Bell. Bell suggested they write a book based on their family tradition of an elf sent from Santa who came to watch over children at Christmas time. Aebersold's other daughter, Christa Pitts, was recruited by the family to share her expertise in sales and marketing. Together, the trio devoted the next three years to promoting their self-published book and attending book signings and trade shows.

The Elf on the Shelf won the Best Toy Award by Learning Express, a Book of the Year Award from Creative Child Awards, and a National Best Books Award sponsored by USA Book News in 2008.

In 2013, the book hit the No. 1 spot on the USA Today bestsellers list. In October 2013, The Elf on the Shelf: A Birthday Tradition was released. Written and illustrated by the same team that created the first book, it offers instructions for inviting a scout elf to visit for a child's birthday party and describes how the elf decorates a chair for the child.

== Criticism ==
The Atlantic columnist Kate Tuttle calls The Elf on the Shelf "a marketing juggernaut dressed up as a tradition", the purpose of which is "to spy on kids". She argues that one shouldn't "bully [one's] child into thinking that good behavior equals gifts." Writing for Psychology Today, David Kyle Johnston calls it a "dangerous parental crutch", akin to what he terms the "Santa lie". Vox published a critique, warning that "the toy can breed competition (and potentially feelings of inadequacy)" and that it added "holiday stress" for parents, as well as calling it "a symbol of the surveillance state disguised as a children's toy".

Many privacy organizations and researchers criticize the product for teaching children that involuntary, non-consensual surveillance is normal. Washington Post reviewer Hank Stuever characterized the concept as "just another nannycam in a nanny state obsessed with penal codes". Professor Laura Pinto suggests that it conditions kids to accept the surveillance state and that it communicates to children that "it's okay for other people to spy on you, and you're not entitled to privacy." She argues that, "if you grow up thinking it's cool for the elves to watch me and report back to Santa, well, then it's cool for the NSA to watch me and report back to the government. ... The rule of play is that kids get to interact with a doll or video game or what have you, but not so with the Elf on the Shelf: The rule is that you don't touch the elf. Think about the message that sends."

Other experts have disagreed, suggesting elves encourage children to be kind and compassionate. "The elf is a visual cue to act nice", Judith Tellerman, clinical professor of psychology at the University of Illinois College of Medicine, tells Yahoo Parenting. "It might remind kids not to fight with their brother".

By 2022, sharing photographs on social media of the elf toy in elaborate poses or situations had become a significant part of the Elf on the Shelf experience for some, with parents attempting to outdo one another's displays. Scenarios shared online included the elf using toilet paper to swing from ceiling lights or filling a sink with hot chocolate and marshmallows. In December 2024, the company released "The Official 24-day Ultimate Elf Ideas Kit" and "The Elf Ideas Super Set" to make the tradition less stressful for parents, which they acknowledge has been a growing concern. One academic noted that "The elf is increasingly being caught doing things a child would get in trouble for doing, which seems to contradict the point of it all."

== Television ==
=== CBS animated special ===
On November 26, 2011, a thirty-minute animated direct-to-TV special, titled An Elf's Story: The Elf on the Shelf, directed by Chad Eikhoff, aired on CBS. It featured the voices of Brendan Dooling and Shameik Moore. The Washington Post criticized the quality of the motion-captured animation and dismissed it as "just a half-hour advertisement for a book and a toy", which it felt would not join "the canon of prime-time animated Christmas specials that actually move the spirit". In contrast, Common Sense Media called the special "a great addition to families' holiday TV traditions", although they warned parents about the consumer-driven nature of the story and made note of its lack of educational value.

=== Netflix deal ===
On October 9, 2020, multiple media outlets reported that Netflix, in partnership with the Lumistella Company, was developing "series, movies, and specials" based on The Elf on the Shelf. The content would be produced by Roy Lee and Miri Yoon, "including original live-action and animated series and movies for pre-school audiences as well as families".

=== Food Network reality television show ===
On October 3, 2023, TheWrap reported that Food Network had developed a reality television show titled The Elf on the Shelf: Sweet Showdown, which premiered on November 19, 2023. Hosted by Duff Goldman, it follows "six teams of what the series is dubbing Sweetmakers for the chance to win $25,000 and the title of the Ambassadors of Confectionery Concoctions. Each week, teams will be challenged to create holiday-themed edible showpieces." Judges included Kardea Brown and Next Great Baker winner Ashley Holt.

== Other appearances and products ==
Elf on the Shelf dolls are typically available with different skin tones and genders. In 2007, a photograph of Jennifer Garner carrying a product box led to a segment on the Today show, driving an increase in sales.

In 2012, The Elf on the Shelf made its first appearance in the Macy's Thanksgiving Day Parade, alongside fellow parade newcomers Hello Kitty and Papa Smurf.

In April 2014, two supplemental birthday products were released: the Elf on the Shelf Birthday Countdown Game and the Elf on the Shelf Birthday Chair Decoration Kit. These are examples of over 150 products licensed by the Lumistella Company, which as of 2023 had sold more than 22.5 million Elf on the Shelf dolls.

In 2019, the Elf on the Shelf brand was extended to a live stage musical, Kellogg's food products, and activities at IHOP restaurants.

In 2023, the Lumistella Company partnered with Beaches Resorts to offer "V.I.E." ("very important elf", a reference to VIP) packages, "butler-curated perks at all three Beaches Resorts in Jamaica and Turks and Caicos".

As of 2023, Forbes estimated the Lumistella Company generated annual revenues of $100 million, while co-CEOs Bell and Pitts were estimated to have a personal fortune of around $50 million.

== Parodies ==
In 2013, Neil Hoffman created the toy and book The Mensch on a Bench, featuring a plush Jewish mensch character.

Other rhyming jokes became popular in internet memes in 2017, after a Tumblr user named "dankmemeuniversity" shared an image of an action figure of Ash Ketchum from Pokémon in a trash bin. It was captioned "You've heard of Elf on the Shelf, now get ready for...", encouraging other users to rhyme "Ash in the trash", an example of a snowclone. The post was reblogged over 180,000 times. Another Tumblr user, "Kawaii Rain", built on the joke with a picture of an action figure of Link from The Legend of Zelda in a sink. Over time, the meme spread beyond gaming references to other genres and celebrities.

== See also ==
- Dinovember
