= Chanda Bell =

American author

- Born: Atlanta, Georgia, U.S.
- Education: State University of West Georgia
- Occupation: Author

Chanda Bell is an American author living in Atlanta, Georgia.

== Early life and professional career ==
In 2004, she collaborated with her mother, Carol Aebersold, on a book published in 2005 about their family custom of having a Scout Elf.

Aside from co-authoring The Elf on the Shelf: A Christmas Tradition, she wrote Extraordinary Noorah: Santa’s Magical Arctic Fox, The Elf on the Shelf's Night Before Christmas and Elf Pets: A Reindeer Tradition.

Chanda Bell is also co-CEO of CCA and B, LLC dba The Lumistella Company as of 2005.

In 2017, Bell co-founded Scout Elf Productions(TM).
