= The Mensch on a Bench =

Children's book

- Author: Neal Hoffman
- Illustrator: Necdet Yilmaz
- Publisher: Monkeybar LLC
- Publication date: 2012
- ISBN: 978-0-615-99053-8

The Mensch on a Bench is a Hanukkah-themed book and doll set created in 2012. The book is written by Neal Hoffman and illustrated by Necdet Yilmaz. It was inspired by a joke Hoffman had made about the 2005 book and doll The Elf on the Shelf. In 2013, the crowdfunding campaign was launched on Kickstarter to market the product. The doll has appeared on Shark Tank, The Today Show, and The View.

The toy and book are sold together as a package, and the book relates a version of the story of Hanukkah.

In 2016, Team Israel adopted the book's Mensch character as their mascot for the World Baseball Classic.
