= National Radiologic Technology Week =

Annual event established by the American Society of Radiologic Technologists

National Radiologic Technology Week® (NRTW®) is an annual event established by the American Society of Radiologic Technologists to celebrate the important role medical imaging and radiation therapy professionals play in patient care and health care safety. The weeklong celebration highlights the radiologic technology profession and raises public awareness about radiologic technologists.

The first National Radiologic Technology Week® was held July 22–29, 1979. The annual celebration was later changed to November to commemorate the anniversary of the x-ray’s discovery by Wilhelm Röntgen on Nov. 8, 1895. It is celebrated on the week of November 8.
