= Dinovember =

Secular holiday celebrated in November

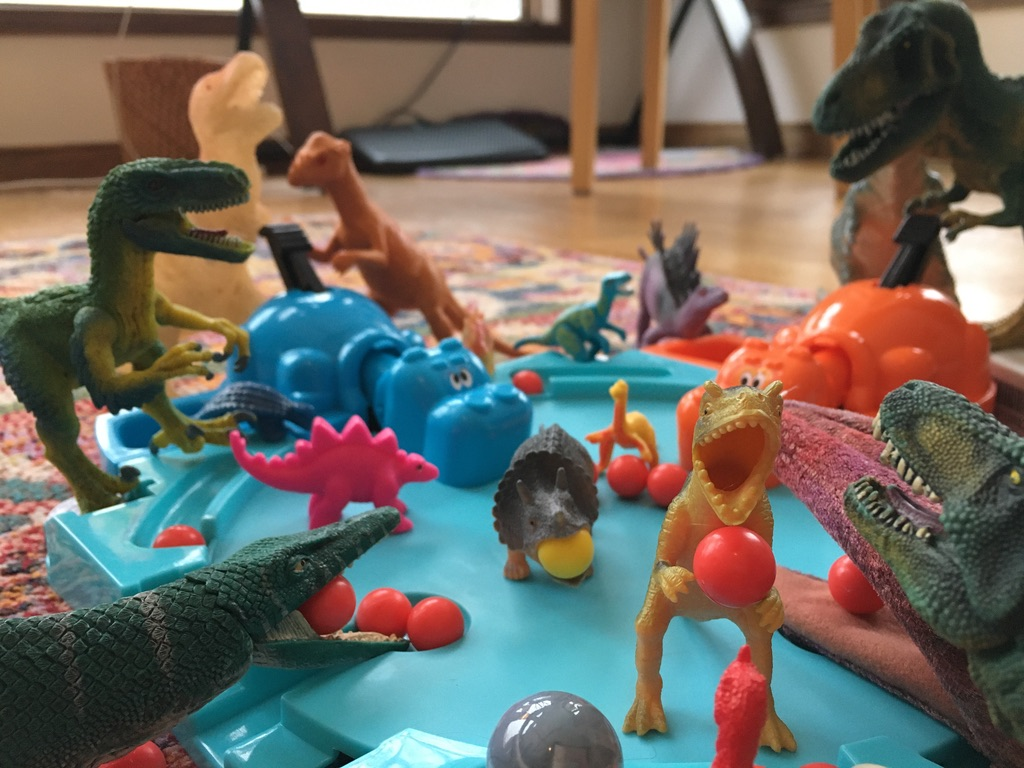
Toy dinosaurs play the game Hungry Hungry Hippos (Quebec, Canada)

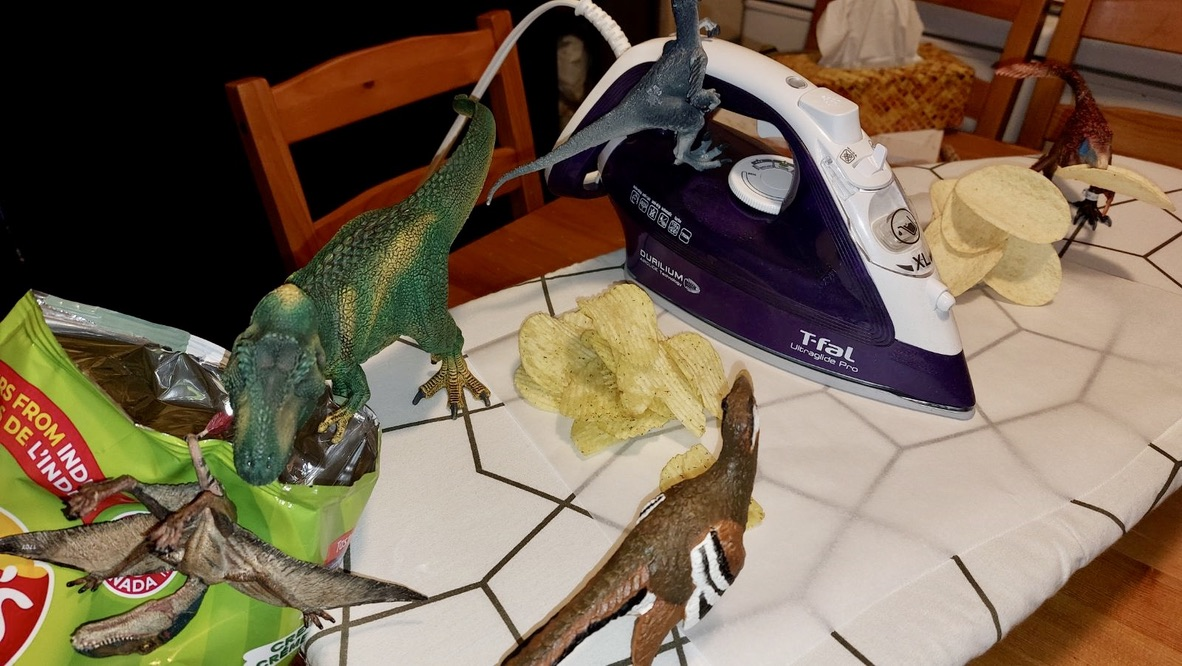
Dinos in Toronto turn crinkle potato chips into pringles

Dinovember is a November observance invented in 2012. On each night of this observance, toy dinosaurs undergo arrangement into charming or mischievous positions making them look alive. Every morning, children find dinosaurs, which remain frozen, while they appear in various positions throughout the setting. The toy decorations undergo changes similar to the Elf on the Shelf, but the organizers keep it free from commercial interests.

== Origins ==
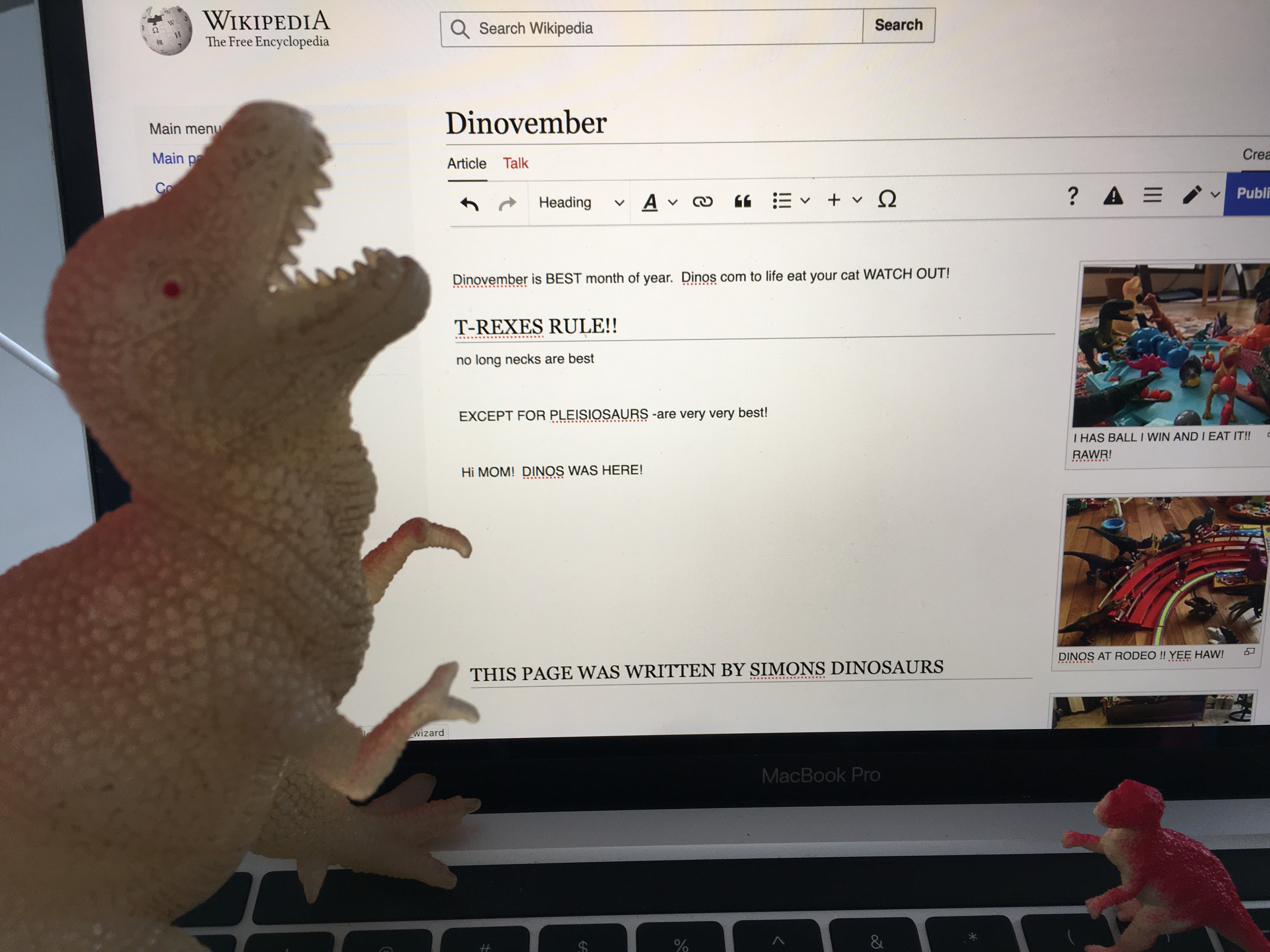
Toy dinosaurs make a Wikipedia page for Dinovember that would not pass the Wikipedia editing standards

Susan and Refe Tuma launched the Dinovember concept at their home in Kansas City, Missouri. Initially aimed at entertaining their young child who interrupted their night rest continually, the Tumas established Dinovember. Susan arranged dinosaur toys that attracted the attention of both their young and older children. The Tumas wrote an essay about their Dinovember project on Medium in 2013, bringing widespread popularity that circulated the event amongst other parents.

According to the practices of Dinovember, dinosaurs awaken to eat leftover Halloween food on November 1 before the alterations in Christmas decorations put them back to sleep on the final day of November.

== Cultural impact ==
Dinovember maintains a devoted group of followers. As of November 2023, the Tumas maintain over 200,000 Facebook followers who track their dinosaur-themed artistic work. Different educational institutions and cultural centers across the globe have adopted the Dinovember concept. The Royal Saskatchewan Museum joins other institutions worldwide by integrating activities related to Dinovember into their programming.

In 2014, the Tumas released "What the Dinosaurs Did Last Night" as a book publication, which drew inspiration from their Dinovember endeavors. During Dinovember each year, many educational institutions, together with families worldwide, continue to carry out the festivities.
