= Hungarian Opera Day =

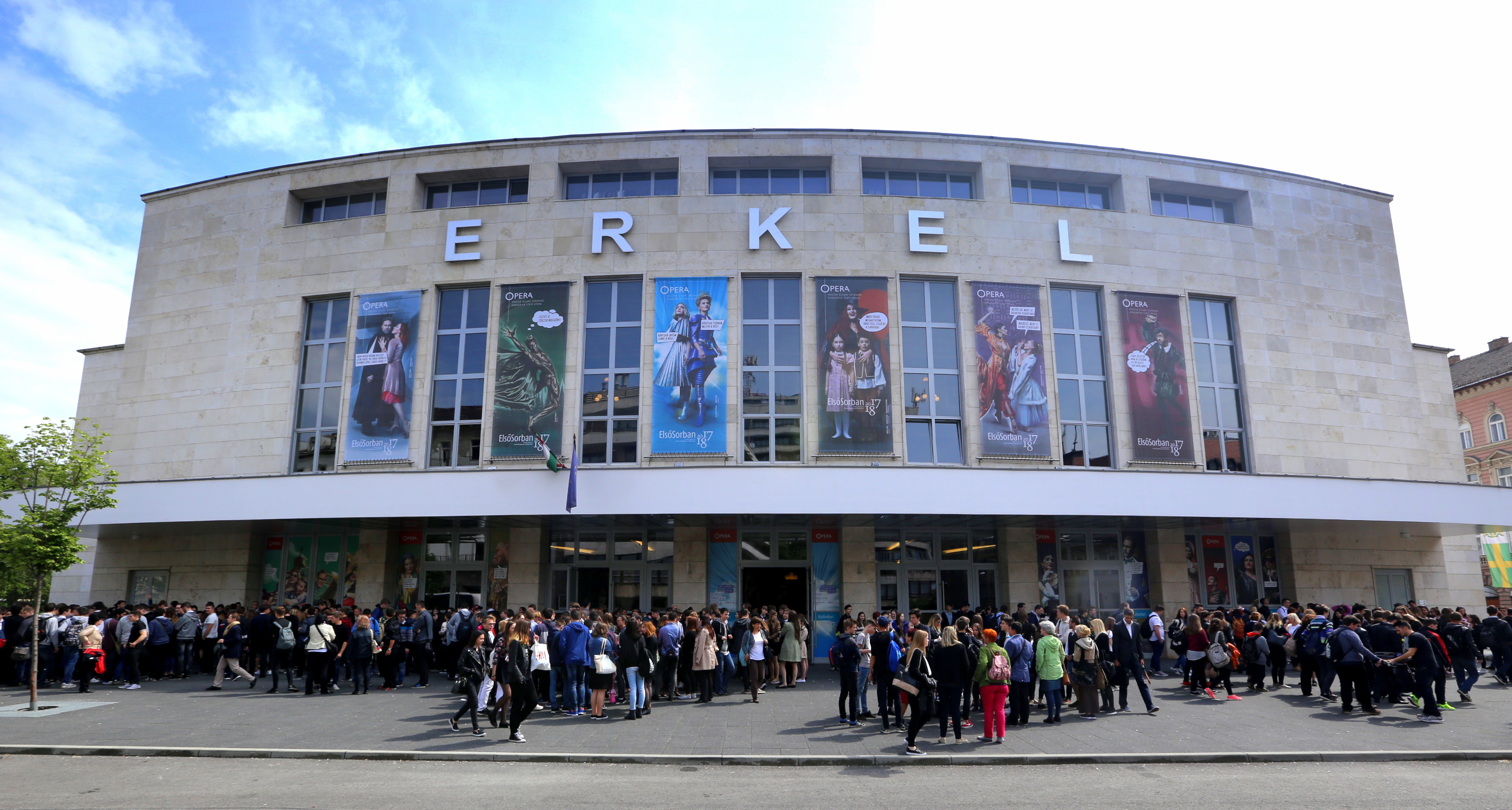
Erkel Theatre, Budapest

Hungarian Opera Day (Hungarian: A Magyar Opera Napja) is a commemoration of the birth of Hungarian composer Ferenc Erkel (7 November 1810) and the reopening of the Erkel Theatre in Budapest. It was first held on 7 November 2013.
