= Day of Missile Forces and Artillery =

- Date: 19 November
- Next time: 19 November 2025
- Frequency: annual

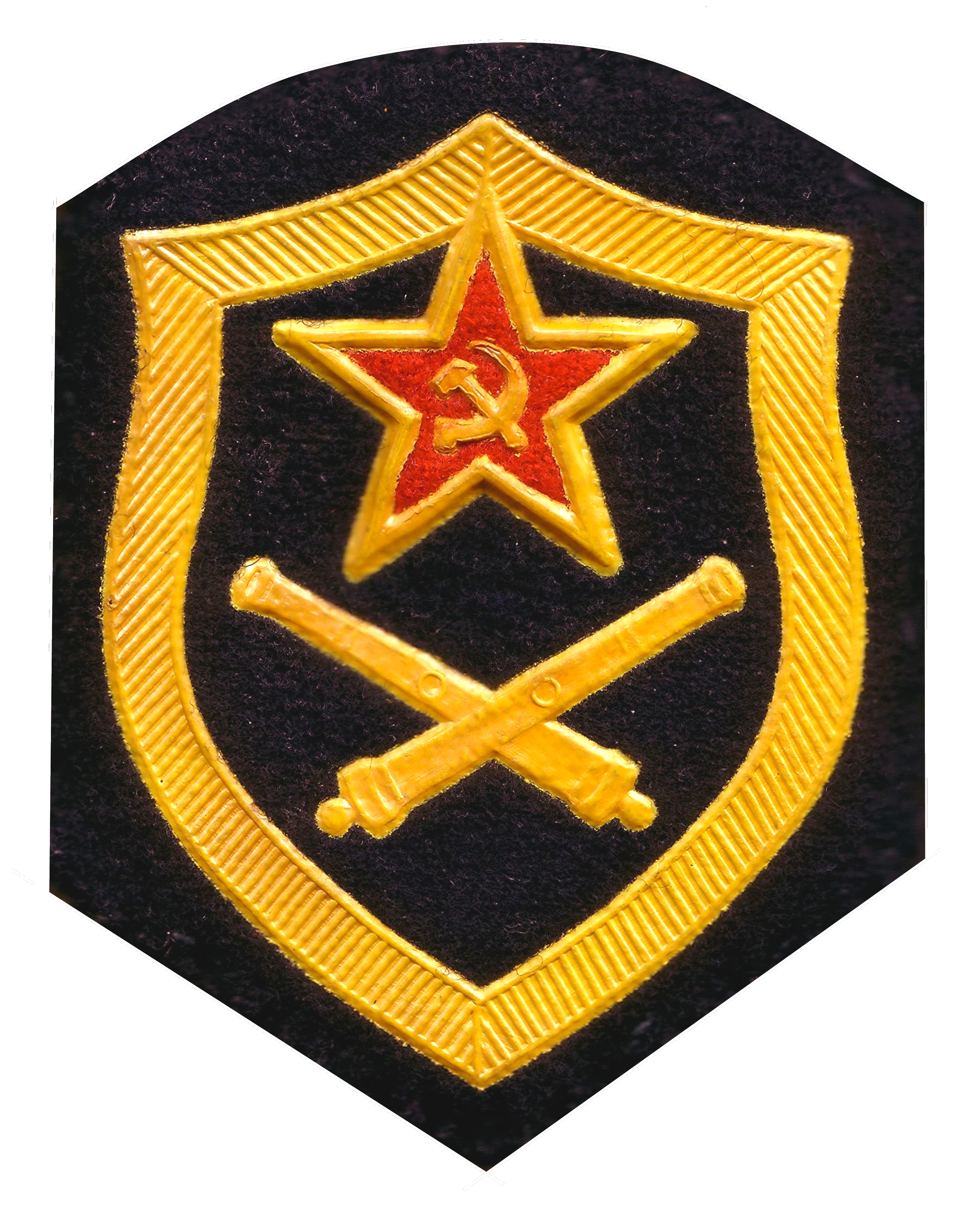
Missile forces and artillery arm sign

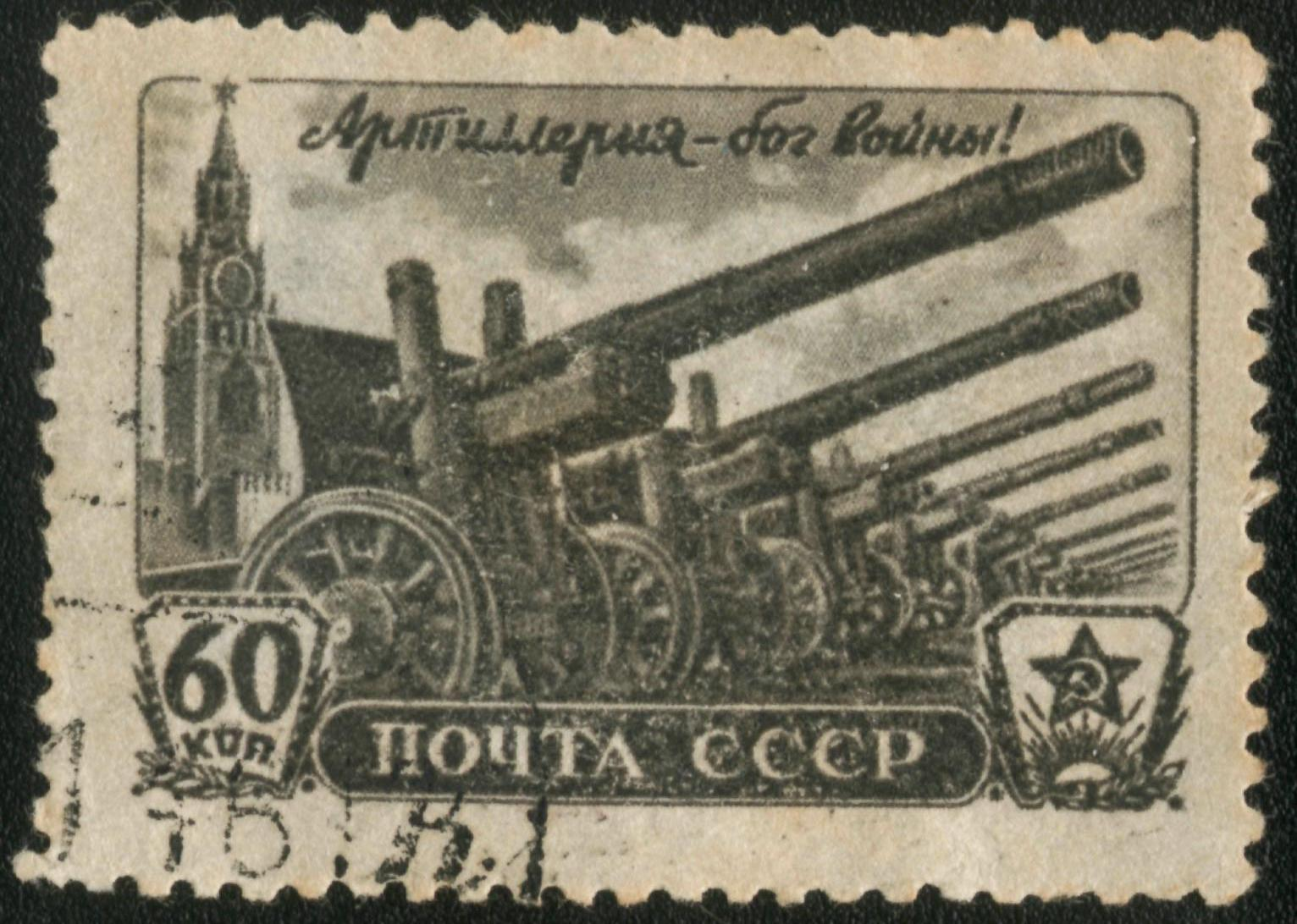
USSR postage stamp: Artillery is the god of the war! (Russian: Артиллерия — бог войны!)

Day of Missile Forces and Artillery (Russian: День ракетных войск и артиллерии, romanized: Den' raketnykh voysk i artillerii) is a holiday celebrated in Russia and Belarus on 19 November.

== History ==
The holiday was first established by a Presidium of Supreme Soviet of the Soviet Union decree on 21 October 1944 as Artillery day of Red Army (Russian: День артиллерии Красной Армии). The date was chosen because the Red Army began their successful counter-attack (Operation Uranus) in the battle of Stalingrad on 19 November 1942, with much help from the artillery of the Red Army.

Since 1964, the holiday bears its present name.

In modern Russia, the holiday has the status of memorable day.
