= Mountain lions in the Santa Monica Mountains =

Wild animal population in Los Angeles

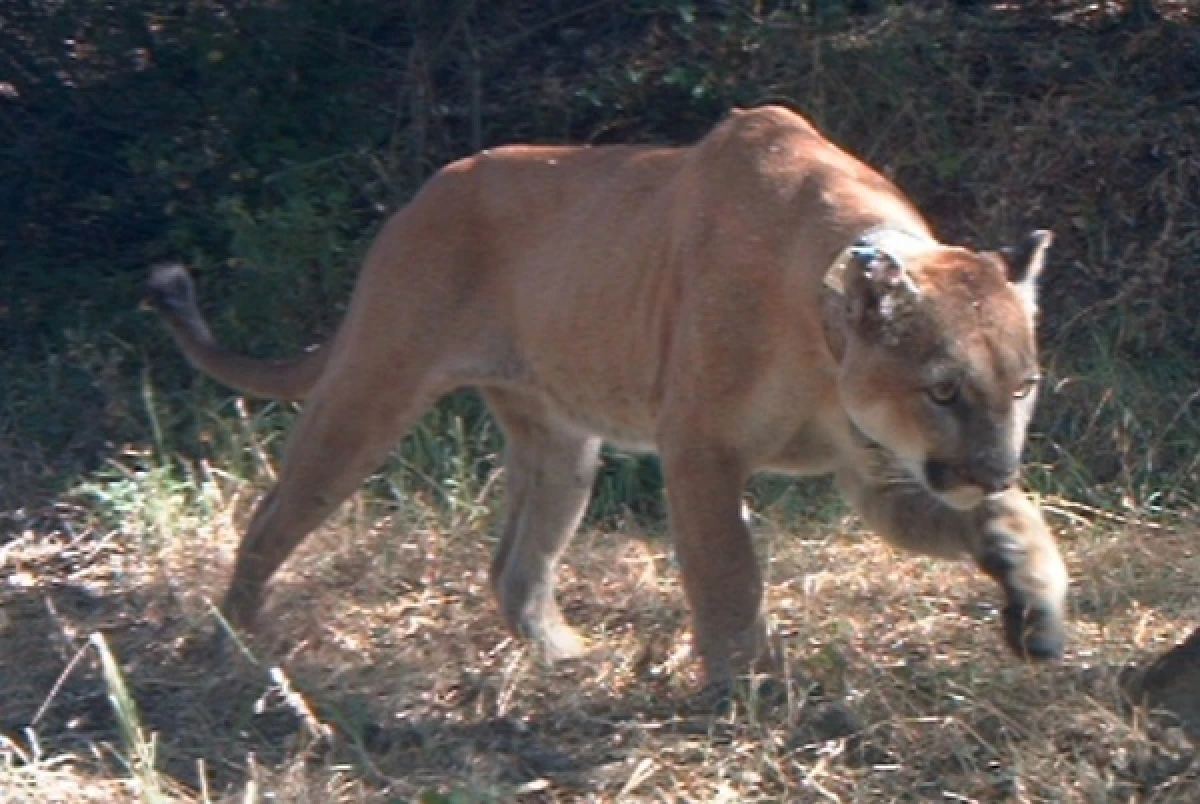
P-12, the dominant male in the western Santa Monica Mountains from 2009 to 2015

The Santa Monica Mountains mountain range, part of the Transverse Ranges in Los Angeles and Ventura counties, currently supports 10 to 15 mountain lions (Puma concolor), despite much of the range being in the Los Angeles metropolitan area. The range has been home to mountain lions since prior to the arrival of Europeans, although their continued survival is threatened by several factors, the largest of which is the isolation of their habitat by freeways.

In 2002, the National Park Service began tracking mountain lions in this area as part of decades-long study. The most notable lion in the study was P-22, which lived in Griffith Park, was photographed in front of the Hollywood Sign, was nicknamed "Hollywood Cat," and was featured on the cover of National Geographic. Other notable lions include P-1 ("King of the mountains"), P-2, P-12, P-19 ("Selfie Cat"), P-64 ("Culvert Cat"), and P-65 ("Coastal Cat").

== Area ==
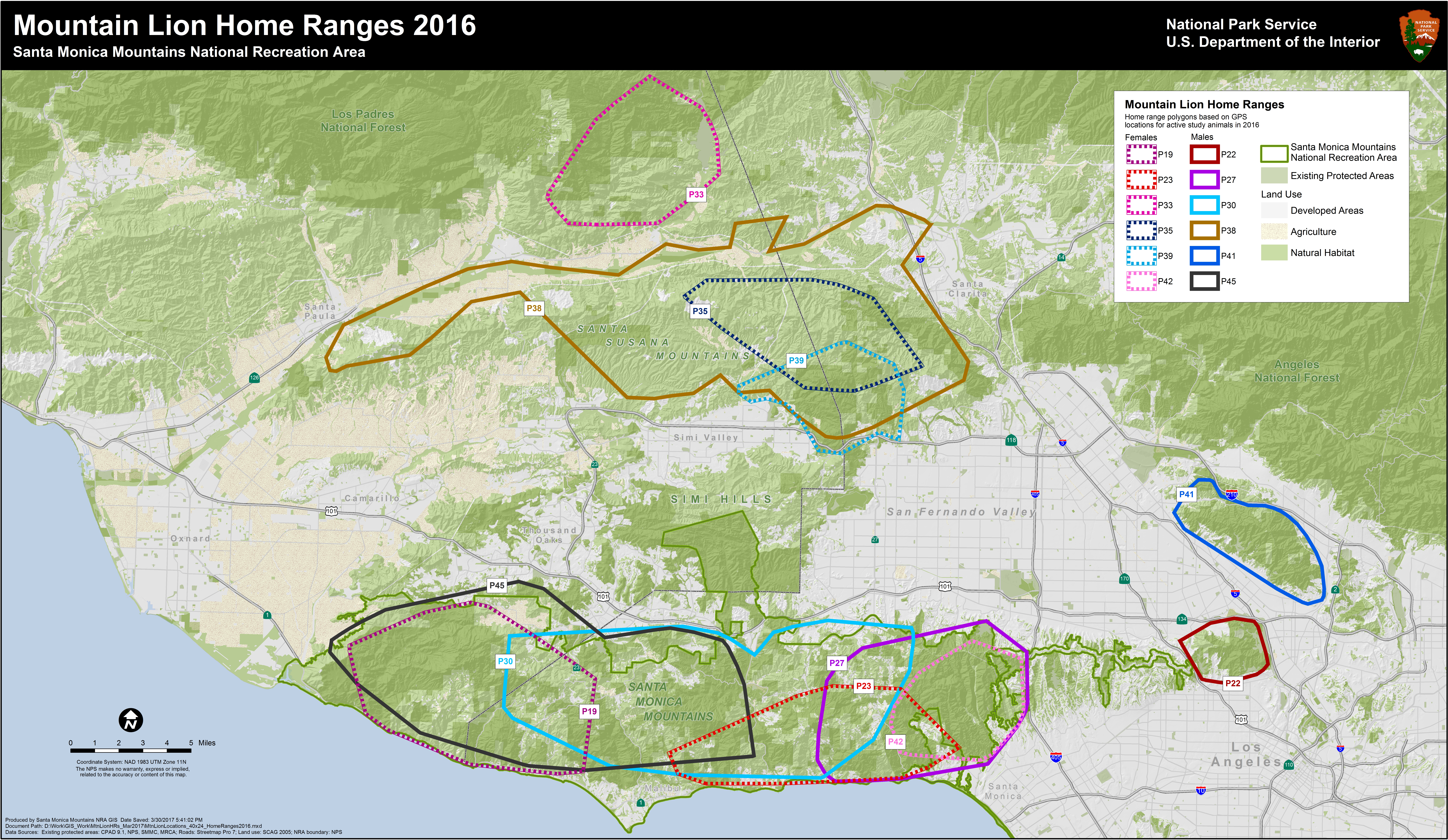
Home ranges of mountain lions in the Santa Monica, Santa Susana, and Verdugo Mountains

The Santa Monica Mountains extend approximately 40 miles (60 km) from the Hollywood Hills in Los Angeles to Point Mugu in Ventura County. Although heavily developed, much of the range has been preserved as local, state, or national parkland, the largest of which is the 153,075 acres (619.47 km^{2}) Santa Monica Mountains National Recreation Area.

Mountain lions are territorial and require ample acreage to find food and mates. The home range of a single mountain lion can be as large as 128,000 acres (520 km^{2}); in the Santa Monica Mountains, a typical range is 96,000 acres (390 km^{2}) for males and 32,000 acres (130 km^{2}) for females. The National Park Service estimates that the Santa Monica Mountains can support 10 to 15 lions, not including kittens. The area is one of only two instances of large wild cats living in a megacity, the other being leopards in Mumbai, India.

== History ==
Mountain lions have lived in the Santa Monica Mountains since before the arrival of Europeans (the Gabrieleño/Tongva word for Puma concolor is tukuurot) and despite the range's relatively small area, the population has remained stable.

Long term survival of mountain lions in the range is threatened by several factors, especially the isolation of their habitat by freeways. This isolation, which started when the Ventura Freeway was constructed in the 1950s and was exacerbated by housing developments alongside it, has led to inbreeding, as the area now has almost no new DNA entering it. Genetic analyses in the 2000s revealed that the Santa Monica Mountains mountain lion population had the second lowest level of genetic diversity ever documented amongst large carnivores in North America, the lowest being Florida panthers in the mid-1990s.

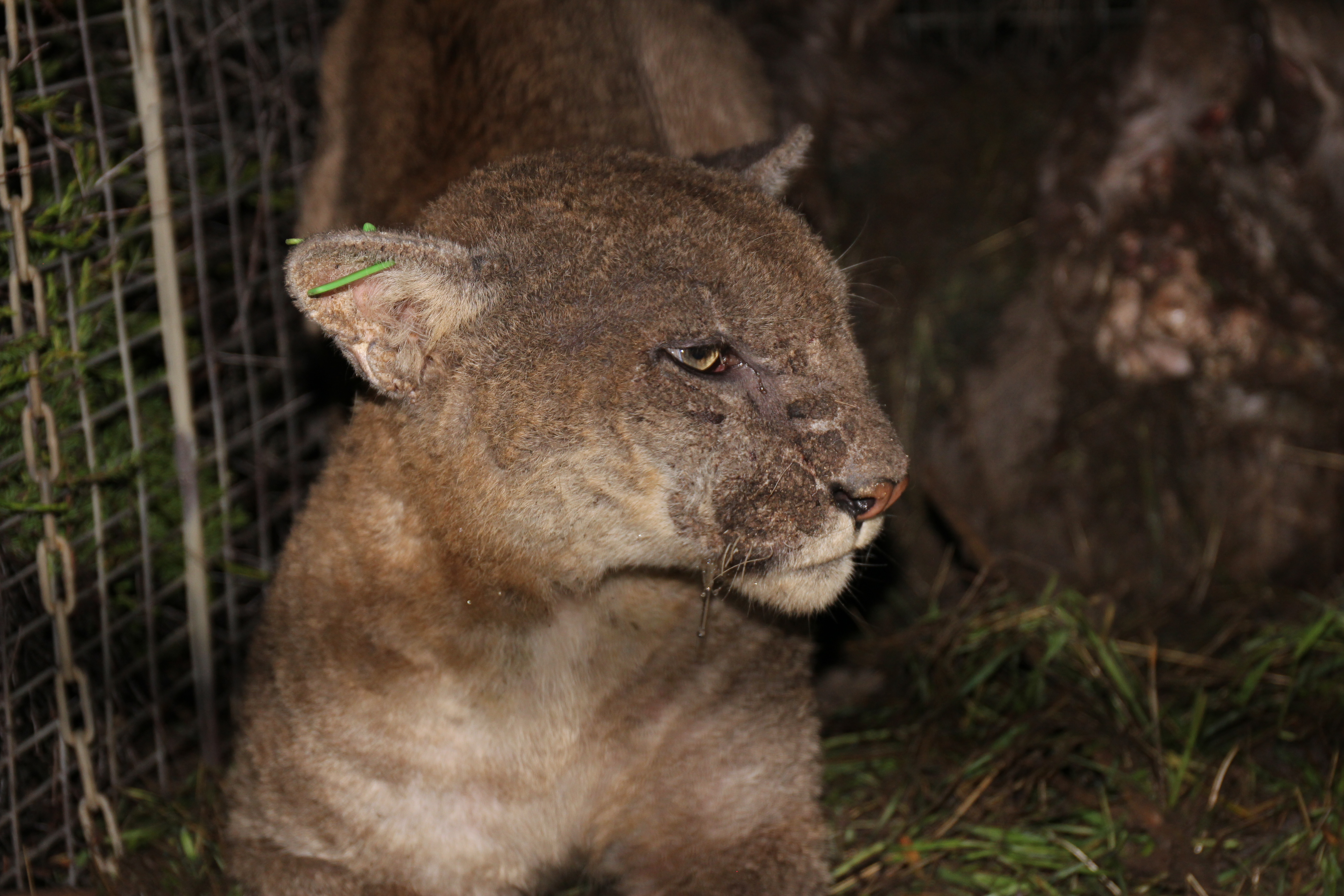
P-53 suffering from mange, a common result of anticoagulant poisoning

Other threats to the Santa Monica Mountains mountain lion population include wildlife-vehicle collisions, anticoagulant rodenticides, and intraspecific conflict. According to the National Park Service, 32 mountain lions in or near the Santa Monicas were killed by wildlife-vehicle collisions between 2002 and 2022; 28 of 29 mountain lions tested for anticoagulant compounds tested positive, including seven fatal cases; and intraspecific conflict, while common in the species, is exacerbated by the small and now isolated nature of the Santa Monicas.

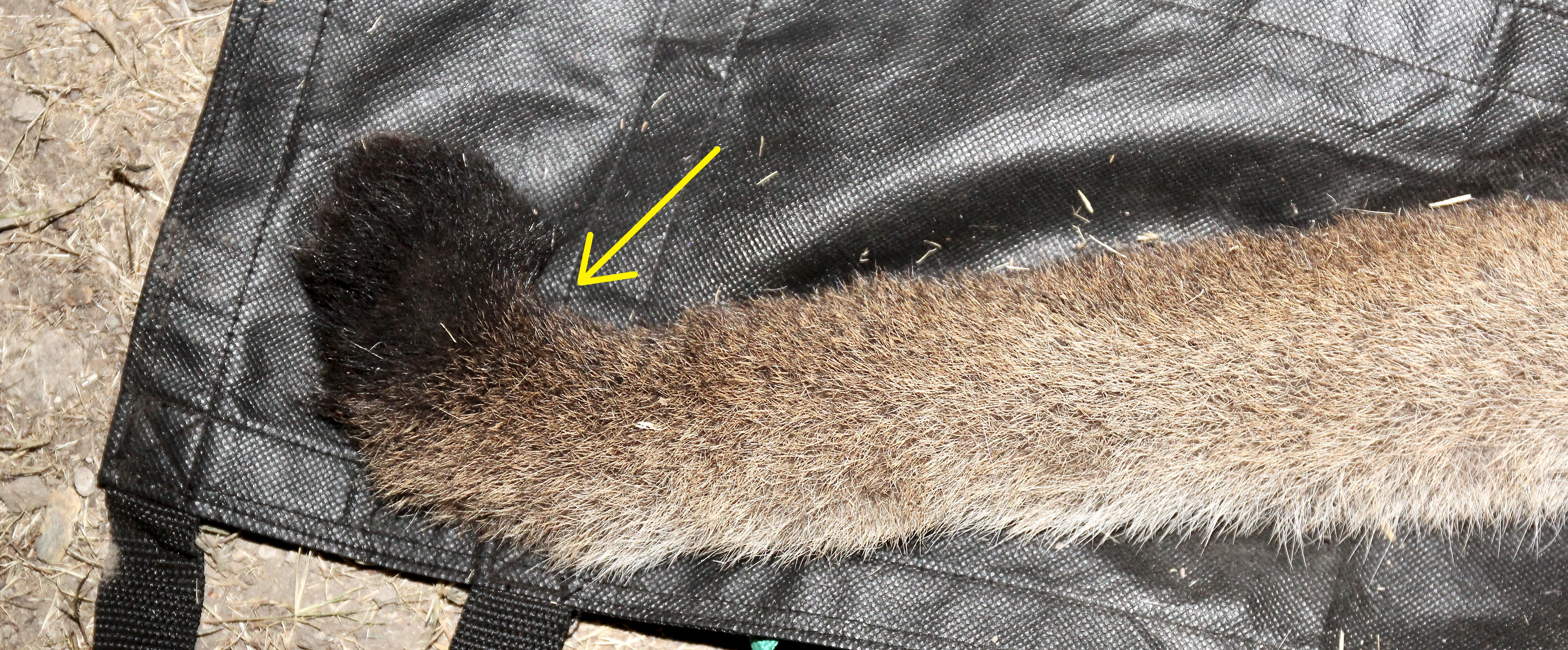
P-81's kinked tail, the first documented case of physical abnormalities amongst mountain lions in the Santa Monica Mountains

In 2016, researchers from the National Park Service, UCLA, UC Davis, and Utah State University predicted that without significant changes, the Santa Monica Mountains mountain lions could become extinct within 50 years. In 2020, researchers found the first evidence of physical abnormalities in the population. The Wallis Annenberg Wildlife Crossing, which will connect the Santa Monica Mountains across US-101 to the Simi Hills, is meant to prevent this. The crossing, which cost $90 million ($99 million in 2025), most of which was raised through private donations, broke ground in 2022. It is expected to be completed in 2026, at which point it will become the largest wildlife crossing in the world.

=== Legal protections ===
The California Wildlife Protection Act, which banned the hunting of mountain lions throughout California, passed in 1990. Mountain lions in the Santa Monica and Santa Ana Mountains were given even more protection in 2020, when the California Fish and Game Commission voted to give them temporary protection under the Endangered Species Act. Since 2002, only one mountain lion is known to have been poached in the Santa Monica Mountains.

Additional legal protection for mountain lions throughout California was provided in 2020, when the state passed the California Ecosystems Protection Act. This law prohibits most uses of second-generation anticoagulant rodenticides statewide and all use of first generation anticoagulant rodenticides on state-owned land.

== Diet ==
Mountain lions in the Santa Monica Mountains primarily dine on mule deer. According to a spokeswoman for the National Park Service, of the more than 400 documented kills by mountain lions in the area between 2002 and 2014, 95% were mule deer; according to the National Park Service's website, 87% of more than 700 kills were mule deer. Coyotes are the second most common prey of mountain lions in the area, and raccoons are third. Mountain lions typically eat about one deer per week, while other prey is eaten sporadically as opportunity arises.

== Individual mountain lions ==
In 2002, the National Park Service began tracking individual mountain lions in the Santa Monica Mountains and surrounding areas. More than 100 mountain lions have been tracked since.

=== Santa Monica Mountains ===
Notable individuals whose home range was in the Santa Monica Mountains include:

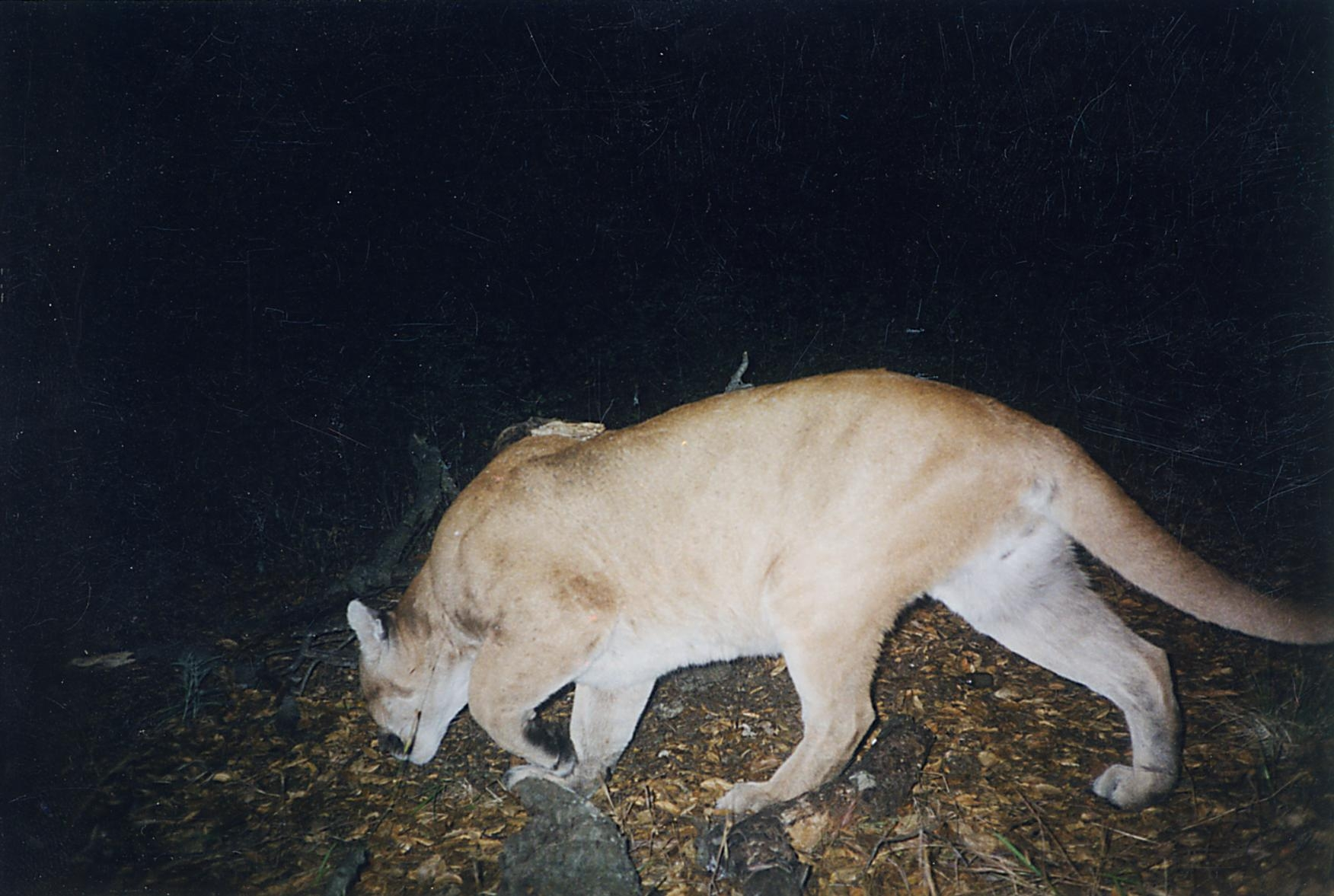
P-1 aka King of the Mountains, the dominant male from 2002 to 2009

- P-1: The dominant male from 2002 or earlier to 2009. Sometimes referred to as the "king of the mountains." First captured and GPS tracked in 2002, at which point he weighed 150 pounds (68 kg) and was estimated to be five years old. With P-6 was the first documented case of inbreeding in the area. Was possibly killed by P-12 in 2009.
- P-2: P-1's mate who weighed 80 pounds (36 kg) and was killed by P-1 in August 2005 when she tried to protect her offspring from him. Gave birth to:
  - P-9 and at least one other (prior to 2004), fathered by P-1
  - P-5, P-6, P-7, P-8, and at least one other (2004), fathered by P-1
- P-6: P-1's daughter who repeatedly mated with him. Born and first captured in 2004 and last captured in the summer of 2006. Gave birth to:
  - P-10, P-27, and at least two others (c. late 2006), fathered by P-6's father P-1
  - P-13 (c. early 2008), fathered by P-6's father P-1
- P-12: The western end's dominant male from 2009 to 2015. First captured in Palo Comado Canyon in the Simi Hills in December 2008, at which point he weighed 120 pounds (54 kg). Estimated to be two years old in 2009 and in February 2009, he crossed U.S. 101 near Liberty Canyon and entered the Santa Monica Mountains, the first documented case of a mountain lion doing so. Shortly after P-12's arrival, P-1 lost his tracking collar in what appeared to be a fight, possibly with P-12. P-12 took over P-1's western end around this time, primarily residing around Trancas Canyon and Malibu Creek State Park, while P-27, whom P-12 avoided, took over the eastern end. P-12 sired at least eight litters and despite providing a genetic rescue, also contributed the second and third documented cases of inbreeding in the areas, with P-19 and P-23 respectively. His GPS tracker stopped working by 2014, he was last seen by wildlife cameras in March 2015, and another large male was found in his territory in November 2015.
- P-13: First captured in the summer of 2009, at which point she was estimated to be fifteen months old. She lived in the western end of the range and was considered the least nocturnal mountain lion in the National Park Service study. Her tracking collar fell off in February 2015. Gave birth to:
  - P-17, P-18, and P-19 (spring 2010), fathered by P-12
  - P-25 and P-26 (late 2011), fathered by P-12
  - P-28, P-29, P-30, and P-31 (2013), fathered by P-12

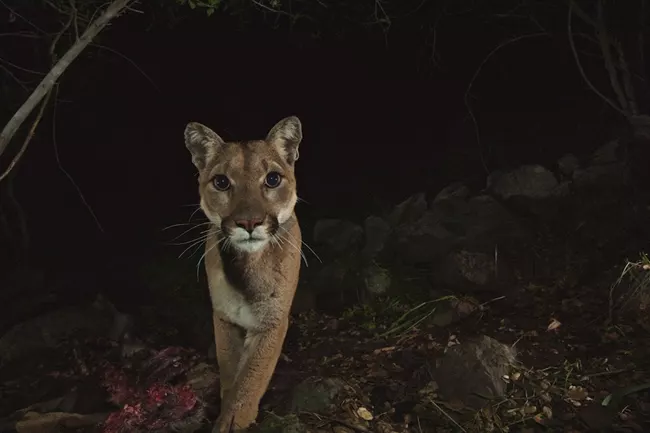
P-19 aka Selfie Cat was known for her photogenic poses captured by trail cameras

- P-15: The only mountain lion to be poached in the Santa Monica Mountains since tracking began in 2002. First captured in either November 2009 or winter 2010 and was found decapitated and with all four paws severed off in September 2011. Was estimated to be seven years old at the time of his death.
- P-19: P-12's daughter who repeatedly mated with him. Born in spring 2010 and first captured in early 2012, she was repeatedly captured in "photographic poses" on trail cameras, earning her the nicknamed Selfie Cat. Gave birth to:
  - P-23 and P-24 (June 2012), fathered by P-19's father P-12
  - P-32, P-33, and P-34 (late 2013 or early 2014), fathered by P-19's father P-12
  - P-46 and P47 (November 2015), fathered by P-45
  - P-70, P-71, P-72, and P-73 (July 2018), possibly fathered by P-19's grandson P-56
  - P-85, P-86, and P-87 (June 2020), father unknown

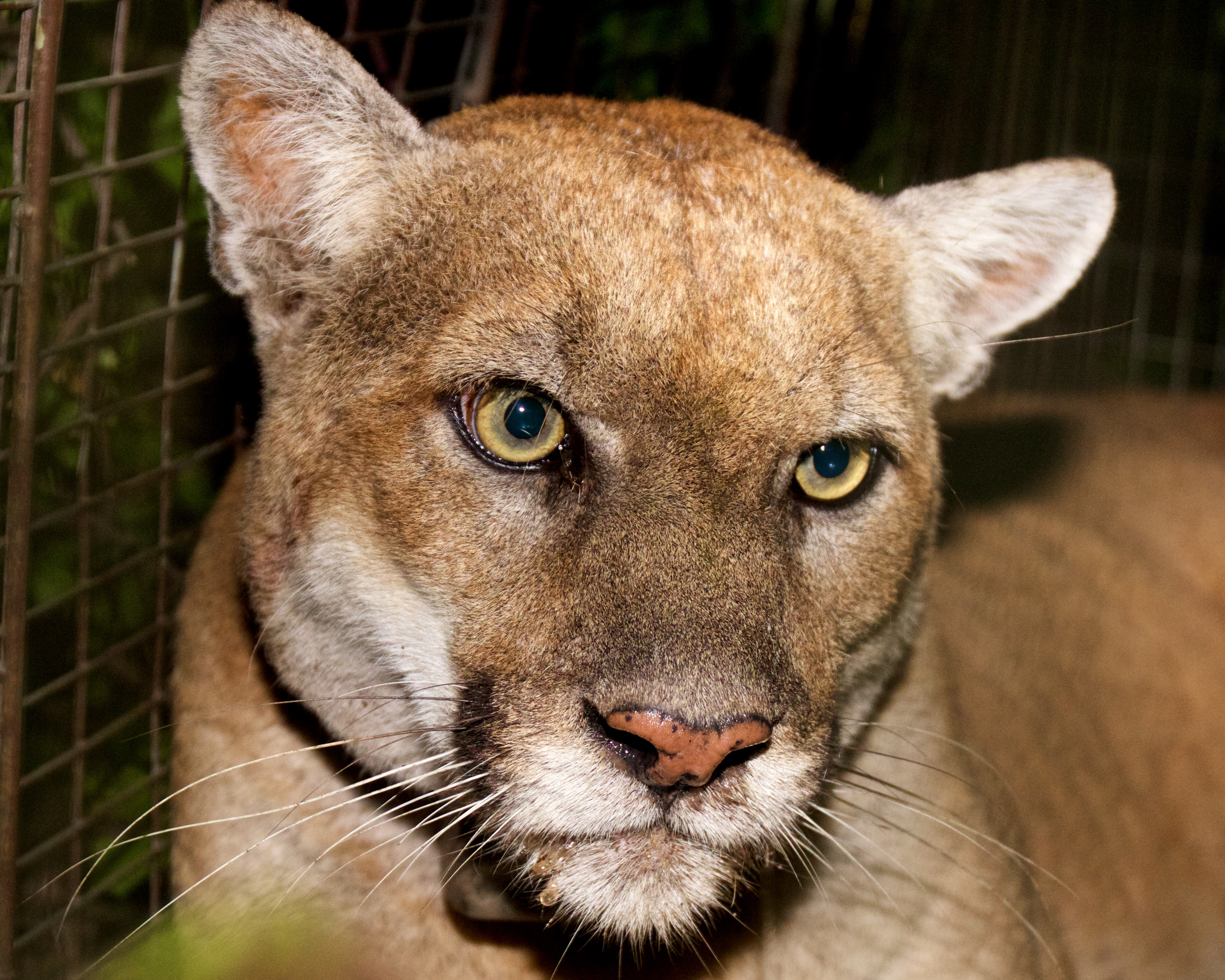
P-22 aka Hollywood Cat lived in Griffith Park and was featured on the cover of National Geographic

- P-22: Dispersed across I-405, US-101, and into Griffith Park, where he was photographed in front of the Hollywood Sign and featured on the cover of National Geographic, for which he was give the nickname Hollywood Cat. First captured in March 2012, at which point he weighed 90 pounds (41 kg) and was estimated to be 1.5 years old, was treated for mange in 2014, ate a koala in the Los Angeles Zoo in 2016, and was euthanized due to multiple injuries and other serious health issues on December 17, 2022. Had the smallest known home range of any mountain lion in the area.
- P-23: P-12's daughter and granddaughter who repeatedly mated with him. Born in June 2012 and died in January 2018 due to a wildlife-vehicle collision near Malibu Canyon Road. Gave birth to:
  - P-36 and P-37 (March 2015), fathered by P-23's father and grandfather P-12
  - P-43, possibly P-53, and at least one other (July 2015), fathered by P-23's father and grandfather P-12
  - P-54 and at least one other (January 2017), possibly fathered by P-23's half-brother P-30

P-23's second litter's birth being so recent after the first indicates no kittens from the first litter survived.

- P-27: The eastern end's dominant male from 2013 or earlier to 2017. First captured in April 2013, at which point he was estimated to be six years old, and was found dead of unknown causes in September 2017.
- P-45: The western end's dominant male from 2015 to 2019. Born north of US-101 in 2012 or 2013, first captured in November 2015, and was suspected of killing twelve alpacas in one weekend in November 2016, for which a depredation permit was taken out but never acted upon.
- P-47: Was large enough to become a dominant male but died before he established himself as one. Born in November 2015 and first captured in January 2017, at which point he weighed 98 pounds (44 kg) and was estimated to be 14 months old. Recaptured in January 2018, at which point he weighed 150 pounds (68 kg). Was found dead on March 21, 2019, likely due to anticoagulant poisoning.
- P-53: P-12's daughter, granddaughter, and great-granddaughter who possibly mated with him. Most likely born in the summer of 2014, first captured in July 2016, treated for mange in March 2019, and died in August 2019 likely due to anticoagulant poisoning.
- P-54: Born in January 2017, first captured in February 2017, and died by wildlife-vehicle collision on Malibu Canyon Road in June 2022. She was pregnant with four kittens at the time of her death. Gave birth to:
  - P-82, P-83, and P-84 (May 2020), likely fathered by P-63
  - at least two kittens (October 2020), father unknown

P-54's second litter's birth being so recent after the first indicates no kittens from the first litter survived.

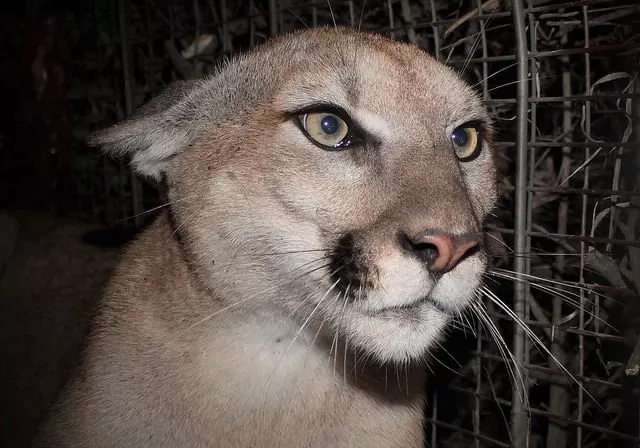
P-65 aka Coastal Cat spent much of her time near the Pacific coast

- P-65: Spent much of her time near the coast, earning her the nickname Coastal Cat. First captured in March 2018, rejected an attempted adoption of P-91 and P-92 in 2020, and was found dead on March 4, 2022 at an estimated five years of age. She was the first mountain lion in the National Park Service study to die from complications of mange; she was also emaciated and tested positive for anticoagulant rodenticides and a neurotoxic rodenticide at the time of her death. Gave birth to:
  - P-88, P-89, and P-90 (June or July 2020), likely fathered by P-63
- P-74: Likely died in the Woolsey Fire in November 2018, possibly with his untracked mother. First tracked in September 2018 and was estimated to be 18 months old at the time of his death.
- P-80: First captured on January 10, 2020, at which point she weighed 82 pounds (37 kg) and was estimated to be five or six years old. Gave birth to:
  - at least one kitten (prior to 2020), father unknown
  - P-93 and P-94 (July or August 2020), likely fathered by P-63
  - P-107 and P-108 (July or August 2022), father unknown
- P-81: Had physical abnormalities, including a kinked tail and one undescended testicle. First captured on March 4, 2020, at which point he weighed 95 pounds (43 kg) and was estimated to be 1.5 years old. Died on January 22, 2023, most likely due to a wildlife-vehicle collision on Pacific Coast Highway.
- P-98: Attacked a 5-year-old boy on August 26, 2021, the first verified occurrence of a mountain lion attacking a human in Los Angeles County in more than 25 years, and was subsequently killed by a wildlife officer the same day. First discovered in the winter of 2020, at which point he was estimated to be three months old, and first captured on August 26, 2021. Weighed 65 pounds (29 kg) at the time of his death.
- P-99: First captured in September 2021, at which point she weighed 75 pounds (34 kg) and was estimated to be two or three years old. Gave birth to:
  - P-109, P-110, P-111, and P-112 (July 2022), father unknown
- P-129: First captured 200 metres (660 ft) from the under-construction Wallis Annenberg Wildlife Crossing in December 2025. Gave birth to:
  - P-131 (2026), father unknown

=== Surrounding areas ===
Additional mountain lions live in the areas surrounding the Santa Monica Mountains, particularly in the Santa Susana Mountains. Some of them originate from the Santa Monicas; others approached the Santa Monicas but turned back rather than attempting to cross US-101; and even more have no connection to the Santa Monicas other than living near them. These mountain lions include:

- P-3 and P-4: Daughter and mother who separately regularly crossed SR-118 between the Simi Hills and Santa Susana Mountains. Either or both may have originated in the Santa Monicas. P-3 was first captured in the summer of 2003, P-4 in the winter of 2004, and both died of anticoagulant poisoning, P-3 in the fall of 2004 and P-4 in the winter of 2004.
- P-16: Dominant male in the Los Padres National Forest near Lake Piru, just north of the Santa Susanas. First captured in May 2010, at which point he was estimated to be 1.5 to 3 years old. Tracking collar removed in January 2014.
- P-32 and P-33: Siblings who separately were the first two tracked mountain lions to disperse out of the Santa Monicas to the north. Both were born in the winter of 2013/2014. P-32 died attempting to cross I-5 in August 2015 while P-33 was found dead from unknown causes in July 2018. P-32 successfully crossed US 101, SR 23, SR 118, and SR 126 before being killed, while P-33 crossed US 101 but did not attempt to cross SR 23.

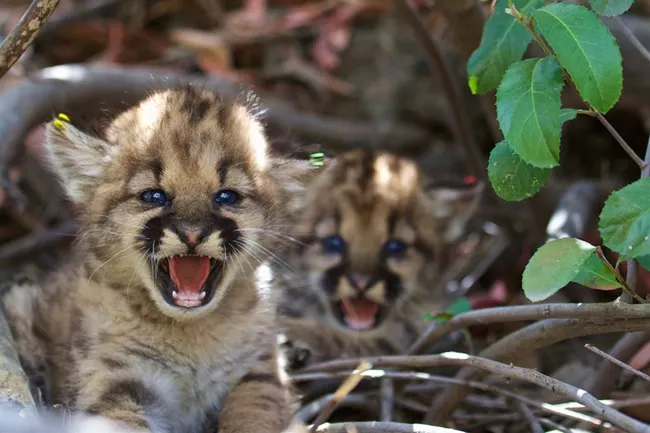
P-48 and P-49 as kittens

- P-35: First captured in April 2014 near Oat Mountain. Gave birth to:
  - P-44 (July 2015), fathered by P-38
  - P-48 and P-49 (June 2016), fathered by P-38
  - at least one kitten (unknown), father unknown
- P-38: Dominant male in the Santa Susana Mountains. Born in 2012, first caught in March 2015, fathered at least four litters, and died by illegal gunshot in June or July 2019, for which the perpetrator pled guilty to unlawfully taking a protected mammal and was sentenced to 60 days in jail, 240 hours of community service, and 3 years probation. The perpetrator was also fined $2,400 ($3,022 in 2025) for damaging P-38's tracking collar.
- P-39: Born in 2011 or 2012, first captured in April 2015, and died by wildlife-vehicle collision on SR-118 in early December 2016. Gave birth to:
  - P-40 (late fall 2014) and at least one other, fathered by P-38
  - P-50, P-51, and P-52 (June 2016), fathered by P-38
- P-41: First mountain lion tracked to the Verdugo Mountains, where he had the second smallest known home range in the area, after P-22. First captured in May 2015, at which point he was estimated to be eight years old, and was found dead from unknown causes on October 4, 2017. Weighed 130 pounds (59 kg).
- P-62: First captured with her daughter P-63 at the Santa Susana Field Laboratory in the Simi Hills in February 2018, at which point she was estimated to be three or four years old. Gave birth to:
  - P-63 and at least one other (late 2016), possibly fathered by P-64
  - P-66, P-67, P-68, and P-69 (June 2018), father unknown
- P-63: Repeatedly crossed US-101 using a method unknown to researchers. First captured with his mother P-62 at the Santa Susana Field Laboratory in the Simi Hills in February 2018, at which point he was estimated to be fifteen months old, and last captured on January 26, 2021.

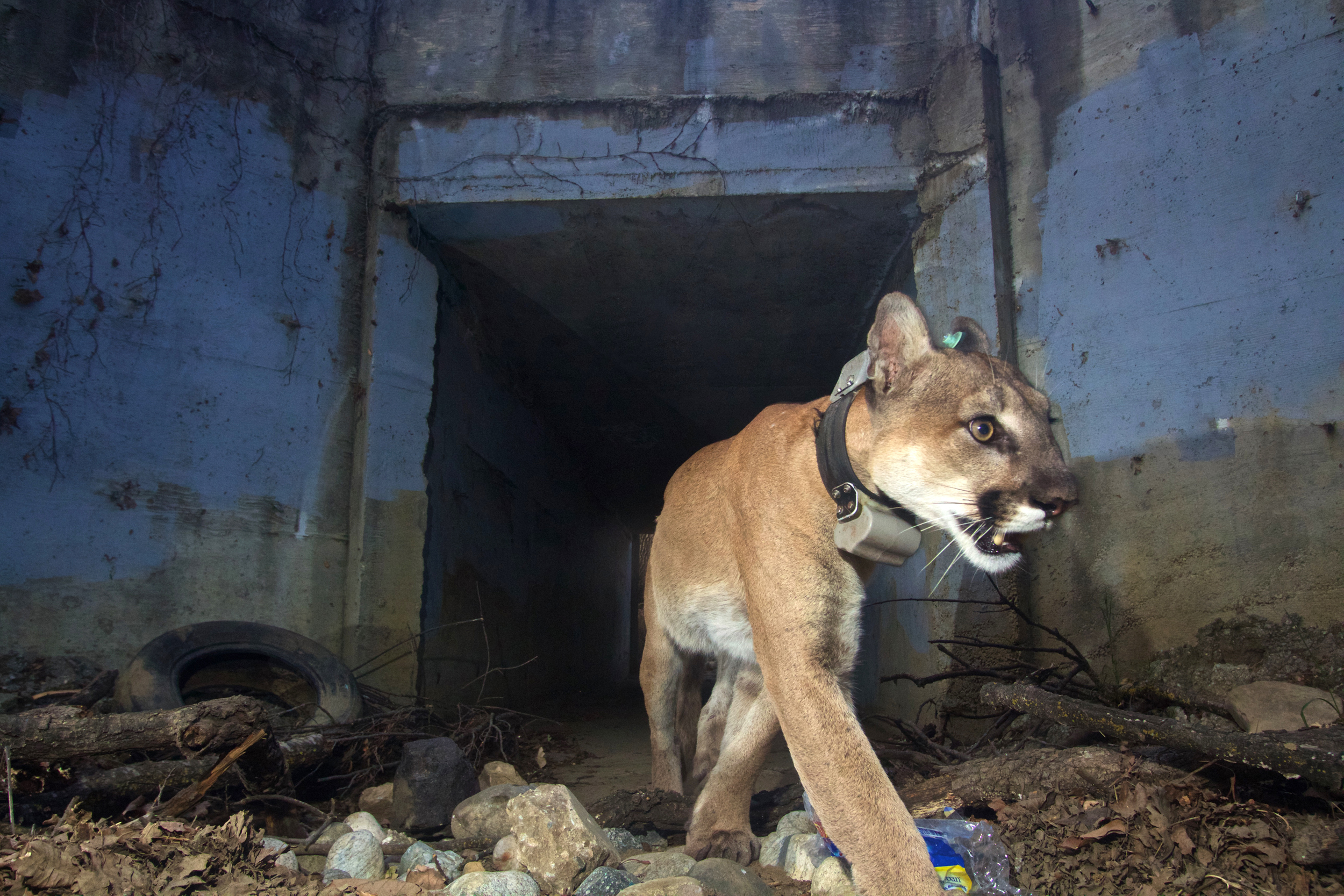
P-64 aka Culvert Cat in front of the culvert he used to repeatedly cross US-101

- P-64: Learned to use a culvert to safely and repeatedly cross US-101, for which he was nicknamed Culvert Cat. First captured in February 2018, at which point he was estimated to be three or four years old, and died shortly after the Woolsey Fire in November 2018.
- P-77: First captured in the Simi Hills in November 2019. Recaptured in November 2020, at which point she weighed 75 pounds (34 kg) and was estimated to be between 3 and 3.5 years old. Gave birth to:
  - P-113, P-114, and P-115 (early 2023), father unknown
- P-91 and P-92: Siblings whose mother died when they were kittens and after an unsuccessful foster attempt with P-65 were relocated to the Southwest Wildlife Conservation Center in Scottsdale, Arizona. First captured as kittens on July 7, 2020.
- P-101 and P-103: Siblings who were relocated to the Orange County Zoo after being abandoned by their mother. Two additional siblings (P-100 and P-102) did not survive the abandonment. First captured as kittens on November 30, 2021.
- P-106: Has a kinked tail, possibly due to a genetic abnormality, despite living in the un-isolated Santa Susanas. First captured on August 3, 2022, at which point she weighed 91 pounds (41 kg) and was estimated to be six years old.

== See also ==
- Asiatic lion § Distribution and habitat
- BB-12 – a black bear who also lived in the Santa Monica Mountains
- Fauna of the Santa Monica Mountains
- Goregaon and Aarey Forest – the areas in Mumbai with big cats
- List of wild animals from Los Angeles
- Urban coyote
- Urban red foxes
- Yellow 2291 – a black bear who also lives in the Santa Monica Mountains
