= P-22 =

Wild animal in Los Angeles (d. 2022)

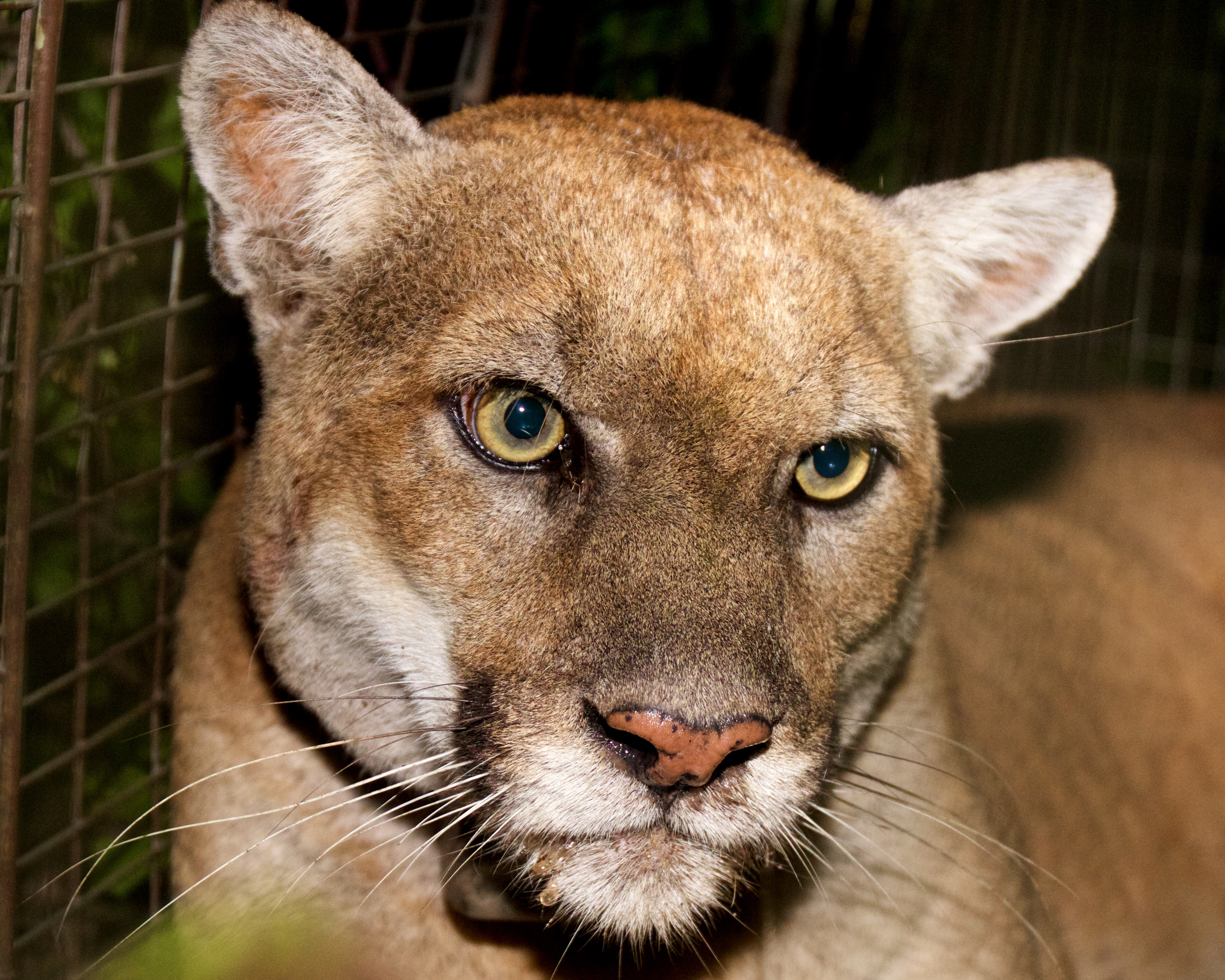
- P-22 in 2019
- Other names: Puma 22; Hollywood Cat
- Species: Cougar (Puma concolor)
- Sex: Male
- Born: c. 2009 or 2010; Santa Monica Mountains, California, U.S.
- Died: December 17, 2022 (aged 12–13); San Diego, California, U.S.
- Cause of death: Euthanasia
- Resting place: Griffith Park, Los Angeles, California
- Residence: Griffith Park
- Parents: P-1 (father); unknown (mother)
- Weight: 123 lb (56 kg) (2012)

P-22 (c. 2009/2010 – December 17, 2022) was a wild mountain lion who resided in Griffith Park in Los Angeles, California, at the eastern end of the Santa Monica Mountains.

P-22 was first identified in 2012, after which he was monitored by radio collar. He lived in Griffith Park for ten years and was often recorded in nearby Hollywood Hills neighborhoods as well. He was captured and euthanized in December 2022, after examinations revealed he was suffering from traumatic injuries consistent with being hit by a car, in combination with several longer-term health issues.

P-22 was the subject of significant media attention, including numerous books, television programs, and other works of art. Most significant was a photograph of him in front of the Hollywood Sign, which was featured in National Geographic. P-22's likeness was also instrumental in funding the Wallis Annenberg Wildlife Crossing.

== Life ==
=== Early life ===
P-22 was born c. 2009/2010 in the western part of the Santa Monica Mountains. Genetic testing showed that his father was P-1, the Santa Monica Mountain's dominant male from 2002 or earlier to 2009. P-22's mother is unknown, as she was not recorded in the study of local pumas.

Sometime before 2012, P-22 trekked east to Griffith Park, where he settled after crossing Interstate 405 and Route 101. His journey was particularly notable because mountain lions are often killed while crossing Los Angeles freeways. The exact route for P-22's journey is unknown.

=== In Griffith Park ===
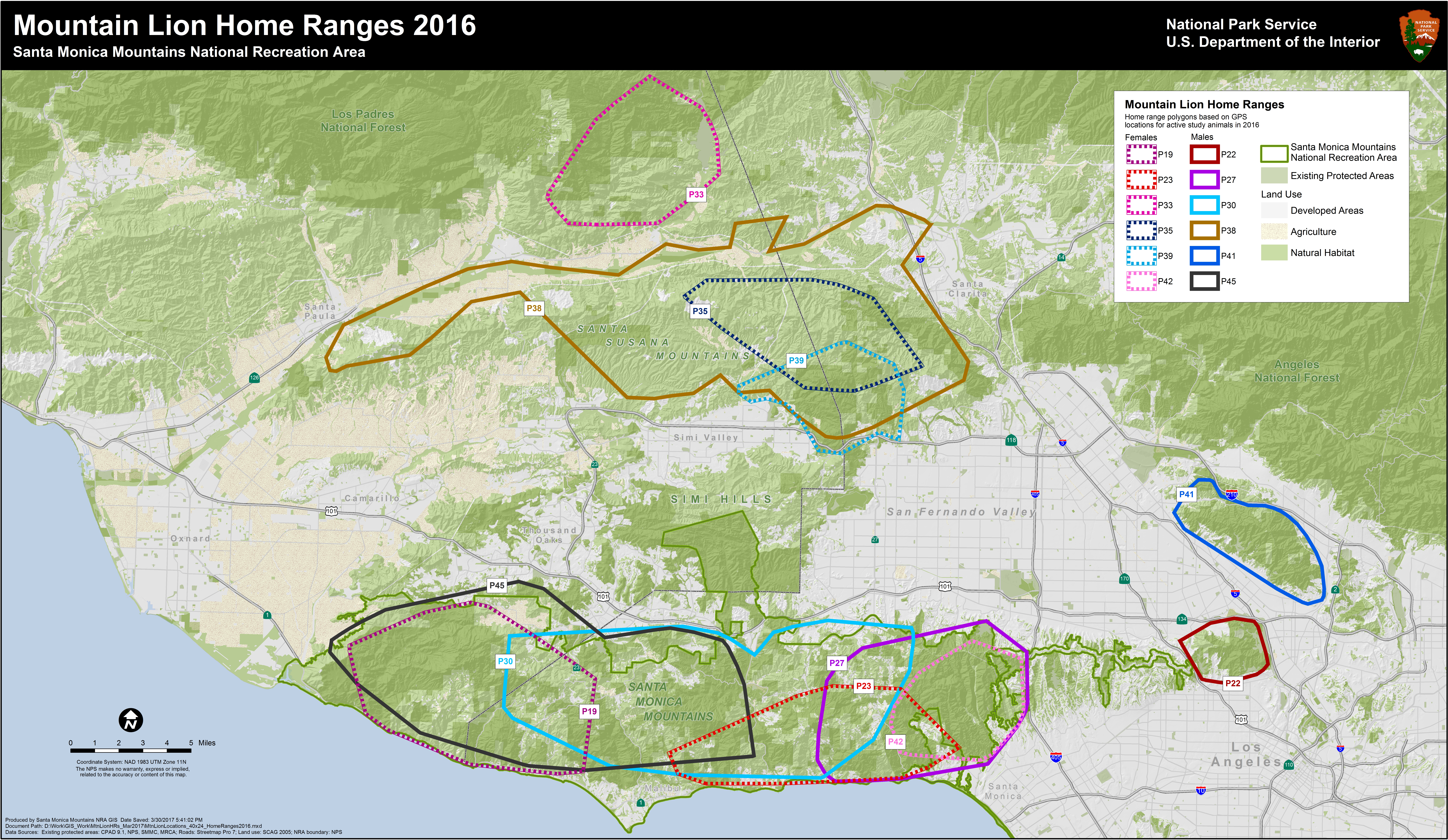
P-22's home range in comparison to other pumas'

P-22 was first discovered in Griffith Park by the Griffith Park Connectivity Study and he was first caught in March 2012, at which point he weighed 90 pounds (41 kg), was fitted with a GPS collar, and was designated P-22. P-22 primarily resided in Griffith Park but was also spotted in the Hollywood Hills, Los Feliz, and Silver Lake. The National Park Service noted that P-22's 9-square-mile (23 km^{2}) Griffith Park habitat was too small for an adult puma by a factor of 31 and that it was unlikely he would find a mate there. It is the smallest range ever recorded for an adult male mountain lion. (Note: P-22 is likely not the first mountain lion to reside in Griffith Park, although the duration of his stay was remarkably long. A mountain lion's body was found in Griffith Park c. 1996/1997 and another was sighted several times in 2004. Rangers also found evidence (including deer remains) to support the latter's presence.)

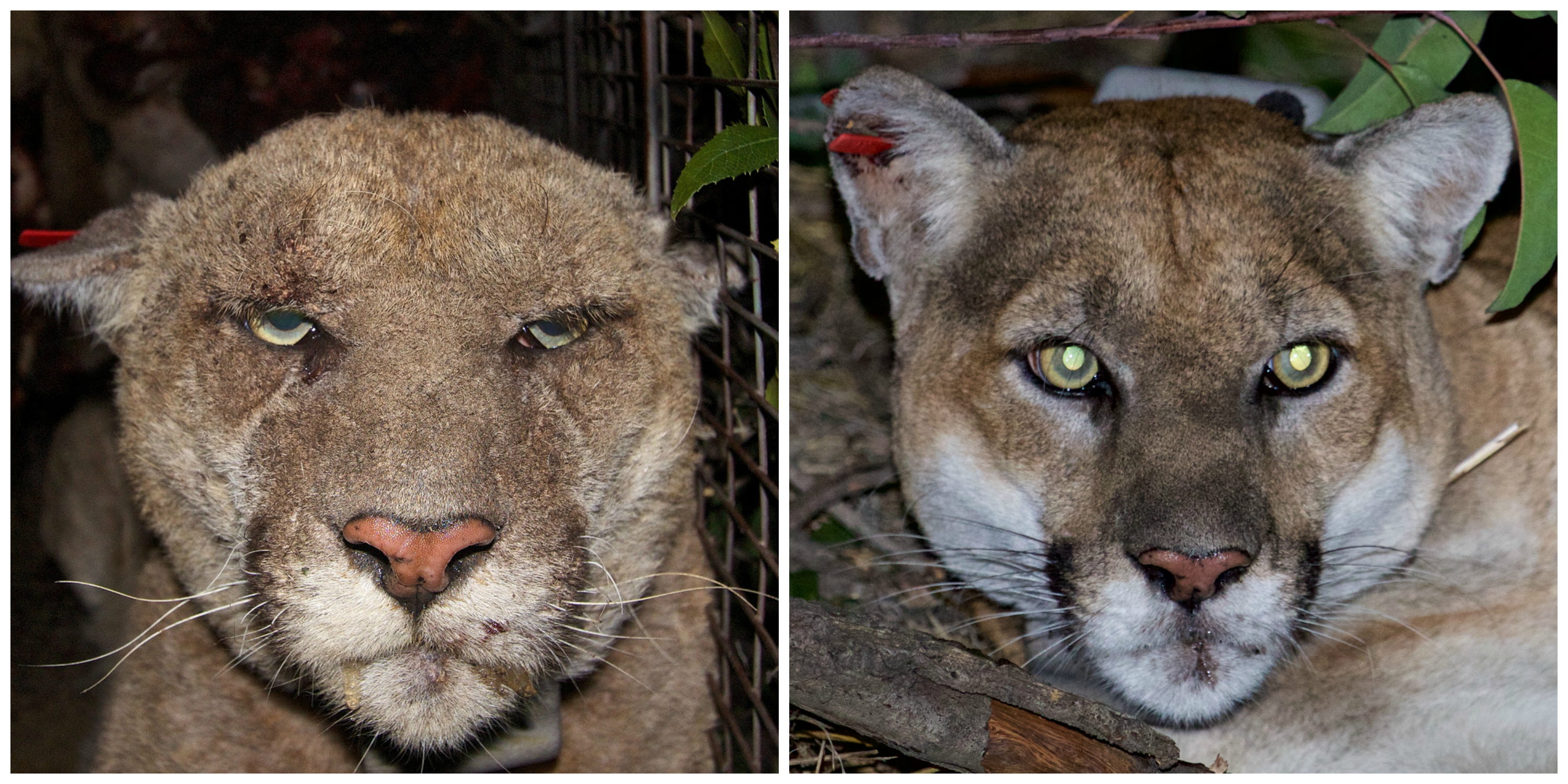
P-22 in March 2014 before his treatment for mange (left) and in December 2015, after treatment (right)

In 2014, P-22 contracted mange stemming from exposure to anti-blood-clotting rat poison by way of biomagnification. The National Park Service captured and treated him, then released him back into Griffith Park. In December 2015, the National Park Service re-captured P-22 and found he had gained 15 pounds and fully recovered.

In 2016, the Los Angeles Zoo reported the disappearance of an elderly koala named Killarney, whose carcass was found outside the koala enclosure. Surveillance footage showed P-22 on zoo grounds, although neither his GPS-tracking data nor camera footage recorded an interaction between the two animals. Los Angeles City Council member Mitch O'Farrell called for investigating the relocation of P-22 after the incident, while the National Park Service called the koala killing "normal predatory behavior" and the Zoo declined to request a depredation permit, instead opting to improve its animal enclosure methods.

=== Capture and death ===
In December 2022, the National Park Service and California Department of Fish and Wildlife announced they would capture P-22 to evaluate his health. Previously, the services had noticed changes in his behavior, including increased agitation and venturing farther from his usual range, culminating in two separate attacks on chihuahuas in Griffith Park's neighboring communities. P-22 was captured in a Los Feliz homeowner's backyard on December 12, after which he was triaged at the Los Angeles Zoo, then taken to the San Diego Zoo Wildlife Alliance.

Officials initially announced that P-22 was in stable condition and that he would not be euthanized unless he was suffering from a serious health condition. The next day, however, officials announced that P-22 would likely not be released back into Griffith Park, as he was significantly underweight, had thinning fur, possible mange, and his right eye was damaged, the latter likely due to a vehicle collision, as one had been reported the night before P-22's capture and P-22's radio collar data supported his involvement. P-22 was further examined at the San Diego Zoo Safari Park, where several serious health issues were discovered, including skull fractures, eye and skin injuries, and herniation of abdominal organs into his chest. P-22 was also found to be suffering from multiple long-term ailments, including stage 2 kidney failure, heart disease, a parasitic skin infection of Demodex gatoi, and weight loss (he weighed 90 lb (41 kg) instead of his usual 125 lb (57 kg)).

P-22 was euthanized on December 17, 2022 at 9:00 a.m. A necropsy found he had a systemic ringworm infection, making him the first documented case of a demodectic mange infection concurrent with a ringworm infection in a California mountain lion. The examination also confirmed that P-22's severe injuries and chronic conditions both impaired his ability to function in the wild and would have lowered his quality of life in human care.

=== Burial ===
Up to a year before P-22's death, the Natural History Museum of Los Angeles County received applications that upon his death, they would use his remains for research purposes and also put his body on display. However, after P-22's death, the museum announced they did not plan to taxidermy his body or put his remains on display. Instead, local Native American tribes requested him buried near Griffith Park with a ceremony to honor his spirit.

After P-22's necropsy, he was transported to the museum, where officials and descendants from Gabrieleño/Tongva, Tataviam, Chumash, Gabrielino-Shoshone, Akimel O'otham, and Luiseño tribes held a blessing ceremony to "welcome P-22 back to his homeland". P-22's remains were stored at the museum until he was buried on March 4 at an undisclosed location in the Santa Monica Mountains. The burial was done in collaboration with local Indigenous partners, the California Department of Fish and Wildlife, the Natural History Museum, and the National Park Service.

== Name ==
P-22 was the 22nd puma tracked in a Santa Monica Mountains National Park Service study, hence the name P (for "puma") and 22. He was also known as Hollywood Cat.

In 2015, radio station KPCC polled listeners to choose a more personal name for P-22. Proposed names included Felix (like Felix the Cat), Yossarian (based on Catch-22), Tukuurot (the Tongva word for mountain lion), Pete Puma (Looney Tunes), Pounce de Leon (Juan Ponce de León), Huell, and Puma Thurman (Uma Thurman). However, the winning name by a large margin was P-22.

== Legacy and tributes ==
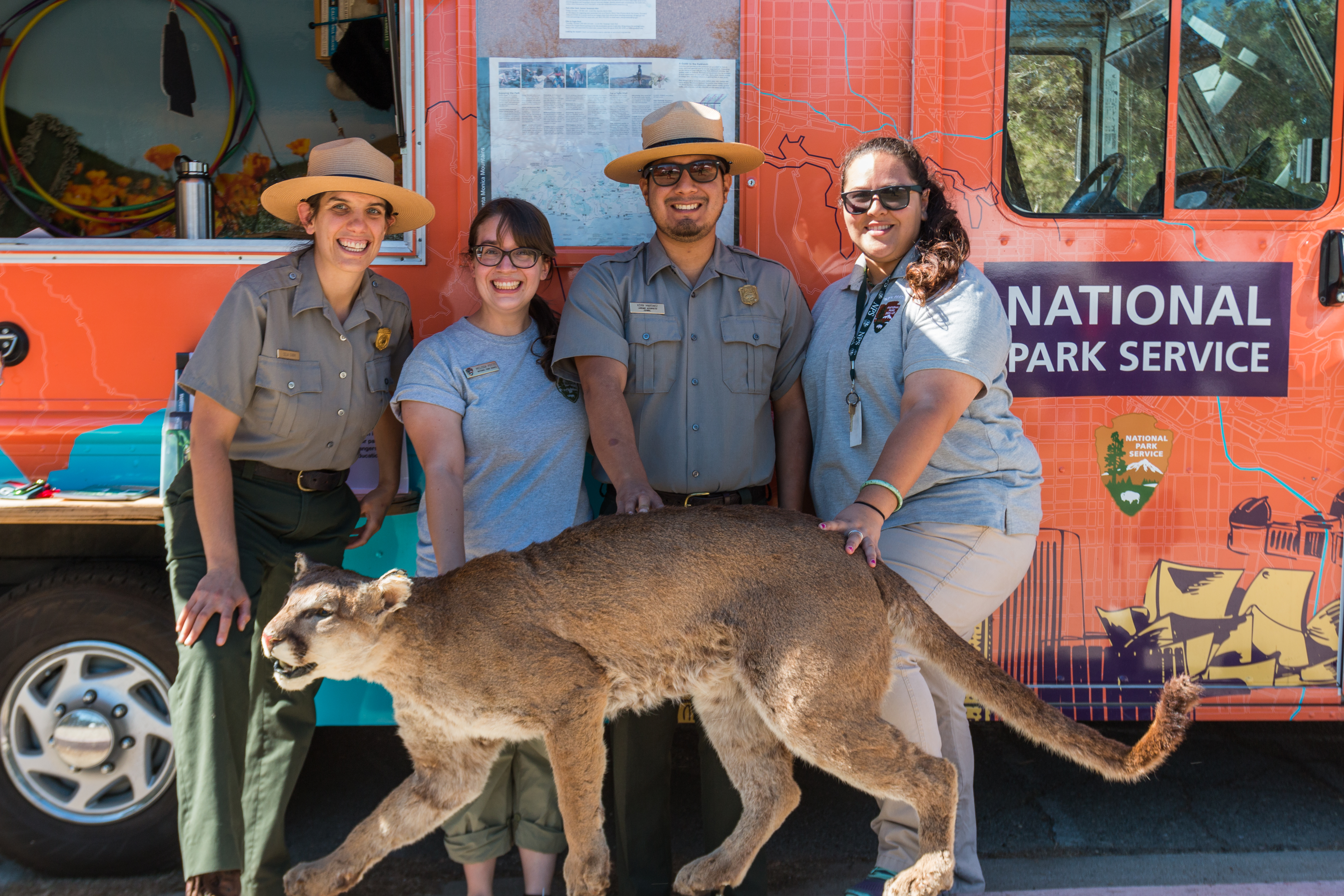
Park rangers and volunteers during P-22 Day in 2017

P-22 was the subject of numerous books and other works of art; he was also mentioned in several movies and television episodes. More broadly, P-22 became a symbol representing Los Angeles culture and wildlife conservation in California. His likeness was instrumental in funding the Wallis Annenberg Wildlife Crossing and articles commemorating him often noted the challenges he faced.

In 2016, Beth Pratt, executive director for the National Wildlife Federation in California, helped establish the #SaveLACougars campaign and held the first P-22 Day celebration. In 2023, the Los Angeles Public Library issued a limited-edition library card featuring P-22's National Geographic photo. The Natural History Museum of Los Angeles County also has an exhibit on P-22.

Numerous community and public figures released statements following P-22's death, including Governor Gavin Newsom, U.S. Representative Adam Schiff, State Representative Laura Friedman, and City Councilmember Nithya Raman. P-22's obituary in the Los Angeles Times described him as "an aging bachelor who adjusted to a too-small space in the big city;" it also described his border-crossing journey to Griffith Park as something many residents could empathize with. The Greek Theatre hosted a celebration of P-22's life on February 4, 2023; that same month, representatives Adam Schiff, Julia Brownley, and Ted Lieu wrote to the Citizens' Stamp Advisory Committee nominating P-22 to appear on a stamp.

=== Murals ===
Several murals in and around Los Angeles feature P-22, including:

Muralist	Location	Year painted	Ref
Jonathan Martinez	Esperanza Elementary School in Westlake	2020	
Jonathan Martinez	Watts	2021	
Jonathan Martinez	Ladera STARS Academy in Thousand Oaks	2022	
Corie Mattie	Silver Lake	2022	
Corie Mattie	Fairfax District	2022	
Corie Mattie	Hollywood Boulevard in Hollywood	2024	

== In popular culture ==
=== National Geographic ===
Photographer Steve Winter worked with wildlife biologist Jeff Sikich to photograph P-22. They spent fifteen months placing camera traps in Griffith Park, often having them stolen, before capturing P-22 in front of the Hollywood Sign. The image appeared in the December 2013 issue of National Geographic.

=== Books ===
Year	Title	Author	Publisher	Notes	Ref.
2017	We Heart P-22: A Coloring + Activity Book Celebrating L.A.'s Most Famous Mountain Lion		Narrated Objects		
2018	P-22: The Journey	Sherry Mangel-Ferber and Calandra Cherry	Ghost Cat Publications		
2020	P-22: The Park	Sherry Mangel-Ferber and Calandra Cherry	Ghost Cat Publications		
2020	The Cat That Changed America	Tony Lee Moral			
2021	Cougar Crossing: How Hollywood's Celebrity Cougar Helped Build a Bridge for City Wildlife	Meeg Pincus	Beach Lane Books	Illustrated by Alexander Vidal	
2023	Open Throat	Henry Hoke	Farrar, Straus and Giroux	Fictionalized portrayal of P-22	

=== Film, television, and theater ===
On television, P-22 was featured as a clue on Jeopardy! in 2022 and his highway journey was parodied in season 4 episode 6 of Bojack Horseman. P-22 was also mentioned and appears (played by another puma) in This Fool; additionally, the show's season 2 premiere includes a memorial dedication to P-22. Films about P-22 include The Cat That Changed America (2017).

Amy Raasch portrays P-22 in her one-woman stage production The Animal Monologues.

== See also ==
- Mountain lions in the Santa Monica Mountains
- Cougar–human interactions
- List of wild animals from Los Angeles
- List of individual cats
