= P-1 (mountain lion) =

Wild animal in Los Angeles (d. 2018)

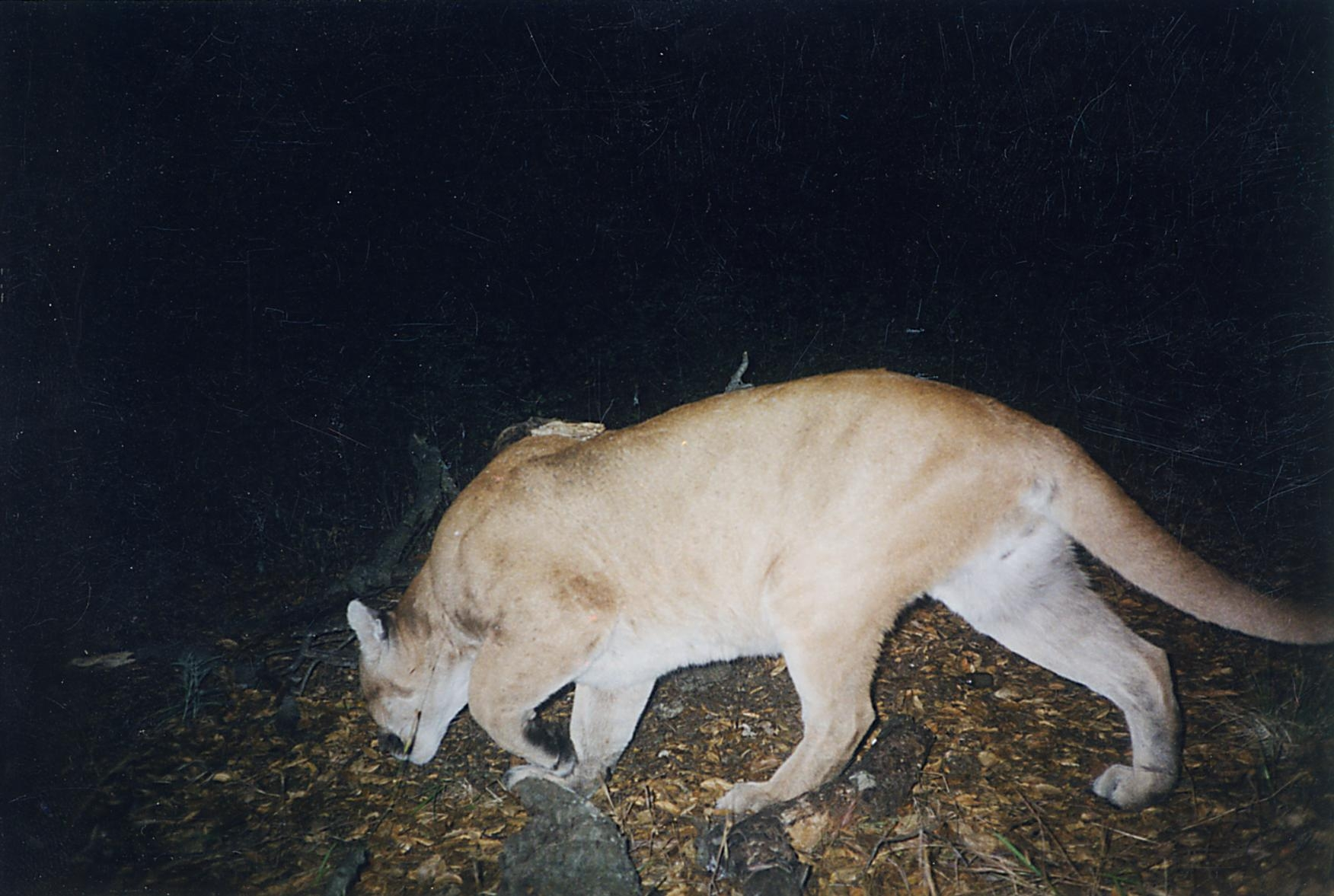
- P-1 in 2002
- Other names: P-001; Puma 1
- Species: Cougar (Puma concolor)
- Sex: Male
- Born: 1996 or 1997
- Died: 2009 (presumed)
- Residence: Santa Monica Mountains
- Mates: P-2, P-6, and at least one other
- Offspring: 22 including P-5, P-6, P-7, P-8, P-9, P-10, P-11, P-13, P-14, P-15, P-20, P-22, and P-27
- Weight: 150 lb (68 kg)

P-1 (1996 or 1997 – 2009?) was a wild mountain lion who resided in and was the dominant male in the Santa Monica Mountains. He was also the first animal GPS-tracked in a 20+ year, 100+ animal study in the area. The Wallis Annenberg Wildlife Crossing was built in response to the inbreeding documented regarding P-1 and other mountain lions in the study.

== Life ==
P-1, the dominant male mountain lion of the Santa Monica Mountains during his lifetime, was captured and outfitted with a GPS tracker in 2002. He was estimated to be five years old at the time and weighed 150 pounds (68 kg). He was captured four additional times between 2002 and 2006.

P-1 was alive until at least 2009, when his tracking collar came off in what appeared to be a fight, possibly with P-12, a male mountain lion who entered the Santa Monica Mountains in February of that year. P-1 is presumed to have died, if not from the fight then due his age, as mountain lions generally do not survive beyond 13 years in the wild.

During his lifetime, P-1 was sometimes referred to as "king of the mountains".

== Family ==
P-1 sired 22 cubs during his lifetime, of which all the males but one were killed by him or others, a common scenario amongst mountain lions in limited space, in this case caused by U.S. 101 cutting off the Santa Monica Mountains from additional wilderness in the area. The one male who survived, P-22, did so by escaping across U.S. 101 and into Griffith Park.

For years, P-1 had two mates, P-2 and another, until he killed P-2 when she attempted to protect their offspring, P-5, P-6, P-7, and P-8, from him. P-9 and another male were also the offspring of P-1 and P-2, but from a previous litter. P-11, P-14, P-15, P-20, and P-22 were the offspring of P-1 and his other unidentified mate.

P-1 also mated with his daughter, P-6, multiple times and killed another daughter, P-7, for unknown reasons. P-1 and P-6 sired P-10, P-13, and two others in one litter and P-27 in another.

== Significance ==
P-1 sired numerous cubs and lived in a megacity, the latter of which is extremely rare for large carnivores. Typically, mountain lion populations require about 420 square miles (1,100 km^{2}) to persist, while P-1 survived in 255 square miles (660 km^{2}).

P-1 was also the first animal tracked in a 20+ year, 100+ animal Santa Monica Mountains study conducted by the National Park Service, and as of 2021, was the largest mountain lion and the one who lived longest in the study. The Wallis Annenberg Wildlife Crossing, meant to de-isolate the Santa Monica Mountains by connecting it over U.S. 101 to the Simi Hills, is currently being built to increase genetic diversity and alleviate inbreeding in mountain lions in the Santa Monica Mountains, the latter of which was documented with P-1 and several others in the study. When completed, the wildlife crossing will be the largest of its kind in the world.

== See also ==
- List of wild animals from Los Angeles
- Mountain lions in the Santa Monica Mountains
- Cougar–human interactions
