= P-64 (mountain lion) =

Wild animal in Los Angeles (d. 2018)

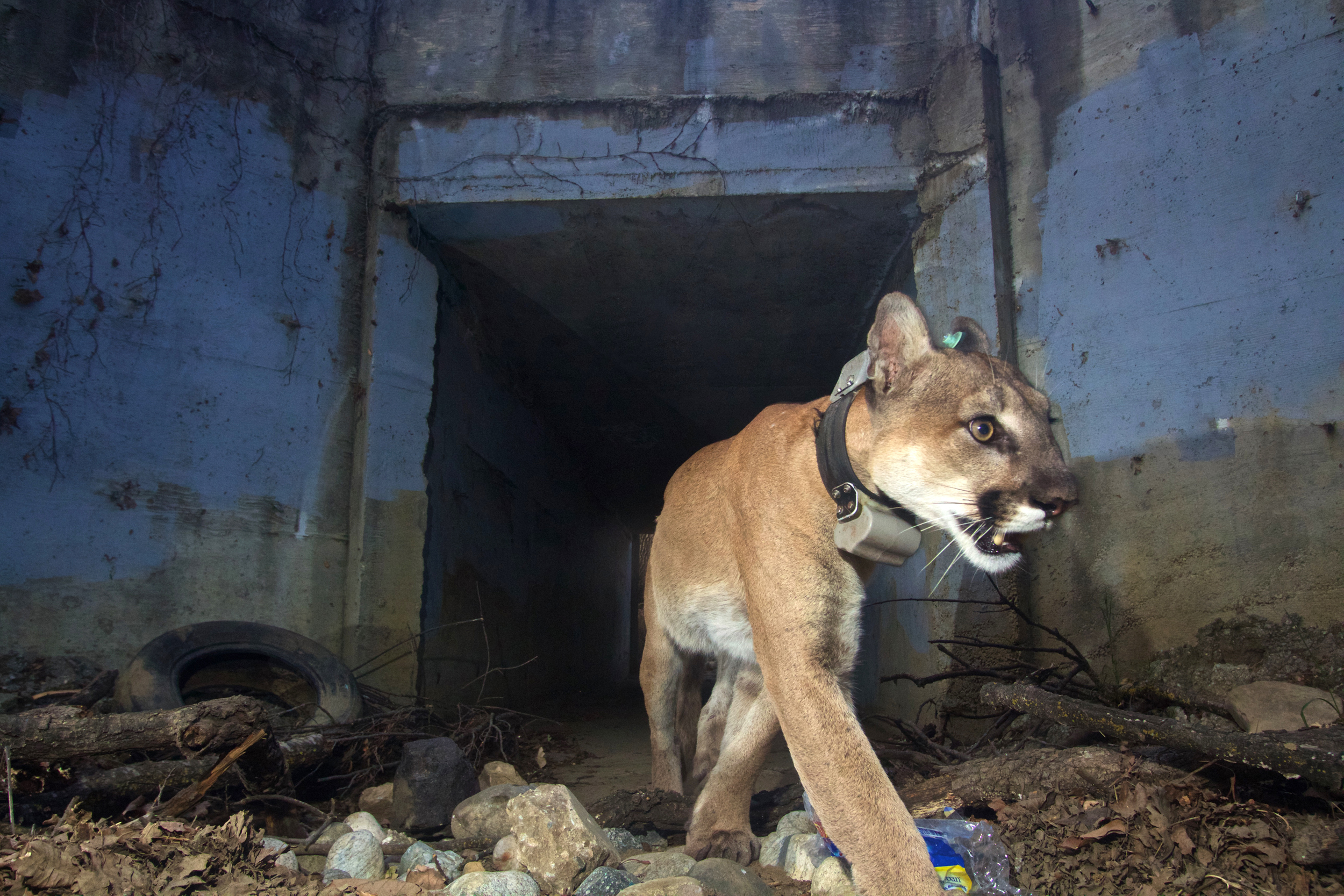
- P-64 emerging from the culvert he was nicknamed after, 2018
- Other names: P-064; Puma 64; Culvert Cat
- Species: Cougar (Puma concolor)
- Sex: Male
- Born: c. 2014
- Died: November 28, 2018 (aged 3–4); Santa Susana Mountains, California
- Residence: Northern Santa Monica Mountains, Simi Hills, and Santa Susana Mountains, California
- Offspring: Possibly four born in May 2018

P-64 (c. 2014 – November 28, 2018) was a wild mountain lion who resided in the northern Santa Monica Mountains, Simi Hills, and Santa Susana Mountains near Los Angeles, California. P-64 was the subject of media attention due to his ability to use a culvert to cross U.S. 101, for which he was given the nickname Culvert Cat, and for his death after the Woolsey Fire.

== Life ==
=== Discovery and tracking ===
P-64 was first captured at the Santa Susana Field Laboratory in the Simi Hills in February 2018, at which point he was fitted with a GPS collar. At the time, he was estimated to be three or four years old.

For the next nine months, P-64 was tracked throughout the northern Santa Monica Mountains, Simi Hills, and Santa Susana Mountains, from south of U.S. 101 to north of S.R. 118. He crossed these freeways a combined 41 times and was only the fifth mountain lion documented to cross U.S. 101 and the second to cross from north to south. P-64 used a culvert near Liberty Canyon to cross U.S. 101, giving him the nickname "Culvert Cat".

=== Death ===
Mountain lions usually escape fires as long as they do not get caught between two of them. A secondary risk, however, is returning to the burn area too early, which can cause feet burns that prevent successful hunting, causing starvation.

P-64 was one of eleven or thirteen mountain lions tracked near the Woolsey Fire when it broke out on November 8, 2018. P-64 traveled for several miles through the burn area, at one point having the opportunity to escape but electing not to, a decision researchers believe was due to his desire to avoid firefighting efforts and urbanization. He eventually settled in a remote area.

P-64 was tracked in an unburned section on November 26, giving researchers hope for his survival, but his tracker stopped transmitting on November 28 and biologists discovered his dead body near this location five days later. He had burnt paws and appeared to have been dead for several days at the time of his discovery. His death was announced less than two weeks after P-74's, the only other tracked mountain lion to die in the fire.

P-64's death was reported as far as India. The National Park Service lists his cause of death as unknown, while other sources have starvation as the cause. Post-mortem testing revealed six anticoagulant compounds commonly used in rat poison in his liver.

=== Family ===
P-64 is the suspected father of four kittens born in May 2018, although this has yet to be confirmed. These kittens were untracked as of December 2018 and so it is not known whether they survived the Woolsey Fire.

== Significance ==
Mountain lions in the Santa Monica Mountains face a lack of genetic diversity due to isolation caused by U.S. 101. Between 2002 and 2018, P-64 was one of only five mountain lion known to cross U.S. 101 and only the second to enter the Santa Monica Mountains, while eighteen died trying to cross the freeway. In doing so, P-64 brought added opportunity for females in the Santa Monica Mountains to mate without inbreeding.

P-64 was given the name Culvert Cat for his use of a culvert to cross under U.S. 101, an ability that was captured by trail cameras and has been described as "pioneering" and "exceptional." How he learned this is unknown, as unlike other animals, mountain lions almost always avoid artificial structures. The culvert itself, 640 feet (200 m) long and pitch black inside due to a bend in the middle, is located near the Wallis Annenberg Wildlife Crossing, of which construction had not begun when P-64 traversed the area. Through use of the culvert and other successful crossings, P-64 was the only mountain lion in the area that could repeatedly cross freeways.

== See also ==
- List of wild animals from Los Angeles
- Mountain lions in the Santa Monica Mountains
- Cougar–human interactions
