= Genetic rescue =

Mitigation strategy

Genetic rescue refers to a mitigation strategy designed to restore genetic diversity and reduce extinction risks in small, isolated and frequently inbred populations. It is largely implemented through translocation, a type of demographic rescue and technical migration that adds individuals to a population to prevent its potential extinction. This demographic rescue may be similar to genetic rescue, as both increase population size and/or fitness. This overlap in meaning has led some researchers to consider a more detailed definition for each type of rescue that details 'assessment and documentation of pre- and post-translocation genetic ancestry'. Not every example of genetic rescue is clearly successful and the current definition of genetic rescue does not mandate that the process result in a 'successful' outcome. Despite an ambiguous definition, genetic rescue is viewed positively, with many perceived successes.

== History ==
The conceptual foundation of genetic rescue can be traced back to the work of geneticist Sewall Wright, who studied the effect of immigration among populations linked by gene flow. More recently, genetic rescue has been defined by scientific reviews as: "when population fitness, inferred from some demographic vital rate or phenotypic trait, increases by more than can be attributed to the demographic contribution of immigrants." Genetic mixing leading to fitness recovery could be described as "genetic rescue", but perpetuates the unclear differences between genetic rescue and pollution.

== Genetic processes ==
When a species' population becomes too small, they are subject to genetic processes such as inbreeding depression from a lack of gene flow, allelic fixation from genetic drift, and loss of diversity. In combination these can lead to a decrease in population fitness, and increase the risk of extinction. Genetic rescue is a conservation tool which tries to address these genetic factors by moving genes from one population to another to increase the overall genetic diversity and minimize inbreeding. This conservation technique intended to increase the fitness of a small, imperiled population through the introduction of beneficial alleles through migration. It is often used for populations of species that are at a high risk of extinction. A successful genetic rescue occurs when the addition of new genes effectively introduces genetic diversity that leads to increased population size and growth rate, as well as a greater population fitness. An unsuccessful genetic rescue may occur if the addition of new genes causes outbreeding depression, which decreases their population fitness. Too much gene flow may lead to genetic swamping through extensive hybridization. Genetic rescue can occur through multiple pathways, including heterosis and adaptive evolution. It is closely related to, but distinctly different from the concepts of genetic pollution, evolutionary rescue, genetic restoration, and assisted gene flow.

=== Gene flow ===
Gene flow (migration) is the introduction of new individuals (and genes) into a target population. Predicting the impact of a migrant on a population will depend on combination of complex genetic and non-genetic factors. Whether migration increases population fitness will depend if the genes brought in are adapted to local conditions and if they decrease levels of inbreeding in the target population. An Introduced individuals can also positively or negatively affect genetic rescue through behaviors such as mate choice, dominance hierarchies, and infanticide.

=== Genetic drift ===
Genetic drift is the fixation of alleles by chance, hence reducing the overall diversity in the population. Genetic rescue can restore diversity by adding new genes to a population, counteracting fixation.

=== Selection and local adaptation ===
Natural selection occurs when variations in heritable traits determines reproductive success of an individual, and thereby determines the persistence of that trait in that population. Genetic rescue may introduce traits that are advantageous to the target population or reduced the frequency of disadvantageous traits, increasing the net fitness of a population to ensure the continued survival as a species.

== Controversy ==
Genetic rescue can be a controversial tool because it is hard to predict how a population will be affected by a migration event. Genetic rescue has the possibility of actually lowering the fitness of a population by swamping the population or increasing rare deleterious alleles. This instance may simply be termed genetic pollution instead of being referred to genetic rescue. Rescue may also only be a short-term solution, as shown by the case of the Isle Royale Wolves. In that case, genetic rescue of the wolves resulted in a large initial increase in population fitness followed by a large decline in subsequent years. Many conservationists argue that genetic rescue could create unforeseen problems for species at risk, and that it overlooks the underlying problems that push so many species to the brink of extinction, including habitat loss due to human development.

As with the term genetic pollution, 'genetic rescue' has political connotations. Some of the more controversial practices which can be considered genetic rescue include

- De-extinction.
- Genetic engineering to produce plants resistant to pests and disease. Although some environmental groups include the use of genetic engineering to save species in their use of genetic pollution.
- Hybridization that increases the viability of endangered populations suffering from inbreeding and genetic drift or saves endlings may be considered part of genetic rescue.

== Examples ==
=== Florida panther ===
A case of successful genetic rescue can be observed in the Florida panther population. Habitat loss and other anthropogenic influences led to small, inbred population which increased the decline of this population (Puma concolor cougar), . Inbreeding depression resulted in kinked tails and cowlicks, sperm defects, and heart abnormalities. The population reached a low of approximately 22 panthers. Fearing inevitable extinction, eight panthers from Texas were translocated to Florida in the mid 1990s. This effort was deemed successful after analysis showed a 4% annual population growth rate following the immigration event. Additionally, researchers found that the resulting hybrid kittens were three times more likely to survive to adulthood than "purebred" kittens. The Florida panther population increased from around 25 to over 100 individuals in roughly a decade.

=== Isle Royale wolves ===
A case of unsuccessful genetic rescue can be observed in the Isle Royale wolf population. In 1997, a single wolf arrived on the island and bred with the wolf population of about 25 individuals. Initially, the addition of his genetic variation resulted in a positive effects on the population, shown by a large increase in population fitness. However, the addition of genetic variation by this immigrant was only beneficial in the short term. The population swiftly declined, with only two wolves sighted in 2016. it is possible that the new immigrant brought a new detrimental allele that increased in frequency as he interbred with the original population or that a single individual was insufficient to overcome the negative impact of genetic load.

=== Greater prairie chicken ===
The greater prairie chicken is a ground-nesting bird with ecological and evolutionary hurdles that necessitated genetic rescue to avoid extinction. It was widely distributed across the North American great plains but now requires population management in small remnant areas. In Illinois, the greater prairie chicken declined from millions of individuals in the mid 19th century to 46 by 1998. This prompted genetic rescue efforts and movement of individuals from neighboring states to increase Illinois greater prairie chicken numbers. This has been considered an early and successful case of genetic rescue. Although the initial genetic rescue actions seem to have led to an increase in fitness, prairie habitat is now limiting recovery. Exclusively genetic efforts to rescue the species are considered insufficient and more focus on habitat protection may be required to save the species.

=== Santa Monica Mountains mountain lions ===
Mountain lions in the Santa Monica Mountains face a lack of genetic diversity due to their isolation caused by U.S. 101, and several documented cases of inbreeding and physical deformations have occurred in the area. In 2008, P-12 crossed U.S. 101 and in doing so brought fresh genetic material to the area. His successful breeding was considered a genetic rescue, although the effects were mitigated when he began mating with his offspring as well.

The Wallis Annenberg Wildlife Crossing, meant to de-isolate the Santa Monica Mountains by connecting it over U.S. 101 to the Simi Hills, is currently being built to increase genetic diversity and alleviate inbreeding in mountain lions in the Santa Monica Mountains. The crossing is located near where P-12 crossed U.S. 101, and when completed, it will be the largest of its kind in the world.
