= California Wildlife Protection Act of 1990 =

California Proposition passed in 1990

California State Legislature
- Full name: California Wildlife Protection Act of 1990
- Signed into law: June 5, 1990
- Bill: Proposition 117
- Associated bills: Proposition 197

Status: Current legislation

The California Wildlife Protection Act of 1990, also known as the Wildlife Protection Act, California Proposition 117, and Prop 117, is a law in the state of California that specifies mountain lions as protected animals, specifically making it illegal to hunt them, with exceptions when one is a threat to livestock or health and public safety. The law also created the $30-million per year Habitat Conservation Fund to acquire land for the purposes of conversation.

== History ==
A precursor to Proposition 117, Assembly Bill 660, was passed in 1972. This bill placed a four-year moratorium on the hunting of mountain lions. It was extended several times.

Proposition 117 was the first initiative to qualify for statewide ballot solely through efforts of unpaid volunteers. It passed on June 5, 1990, with 52% voting for it and 48% against.

Proposition 197, which would have amended the Wildlife Protection Act to allow the sport-hunting of mountain lions, failed in 1996, with 58% voting no and 42% voting yes.

The Wildlife Protection Act's Habitat Conservation Fund was originally funded from 1990 to 2020. In 2019, the fund was extended to 2030. Additional legislation was introduced in 2025 to extend the fund to 2035.

== Effects ==
=== Mountain lions ===
Mountain lion attacks on humans and livestock increased in the five years after Proposition 117 passed. In response, the Department of Fish and Wildlife increased their issuance of depredation permits, which reduced these attacks.

As of 2023, Proposition 117 has not caused mountain lions to become overpopulated, as their social structures and food availability are able to control the population on their own. However, daytime mountain lion sightings, including in populated areas, have increased, likely due to Proposition 117 effectively banning the "nonlethal pursuit and treeing of mountain lions with hounds."

About one hundred mountain lions are killed in California each year through Proposition 117's depredation exception.

=== Wildlife habitats ===
As of 2010, more than 2.2 million acres of wildlife habitat have been protected through Proposition 117's Habitat Conservation Fund. These habitats include:

- 300,000 acres for mountain lions
- 337,000 acres for additional wildlife
- 267,000 acres of wetlands
- 1,000,000+ acres of fisheries and river banks
- nearly 145,000 acres for hiking and interpretive programs

The Habitat Conservation Fund has also helped fund hundreds of projects, most notably the Wallis Annenberg Wildlife Crossing and a new trail gateway into Redwood National and State Parks.
