= P-2 (mountain lion) =

Wild animal in Los Angeles (d. 2005)

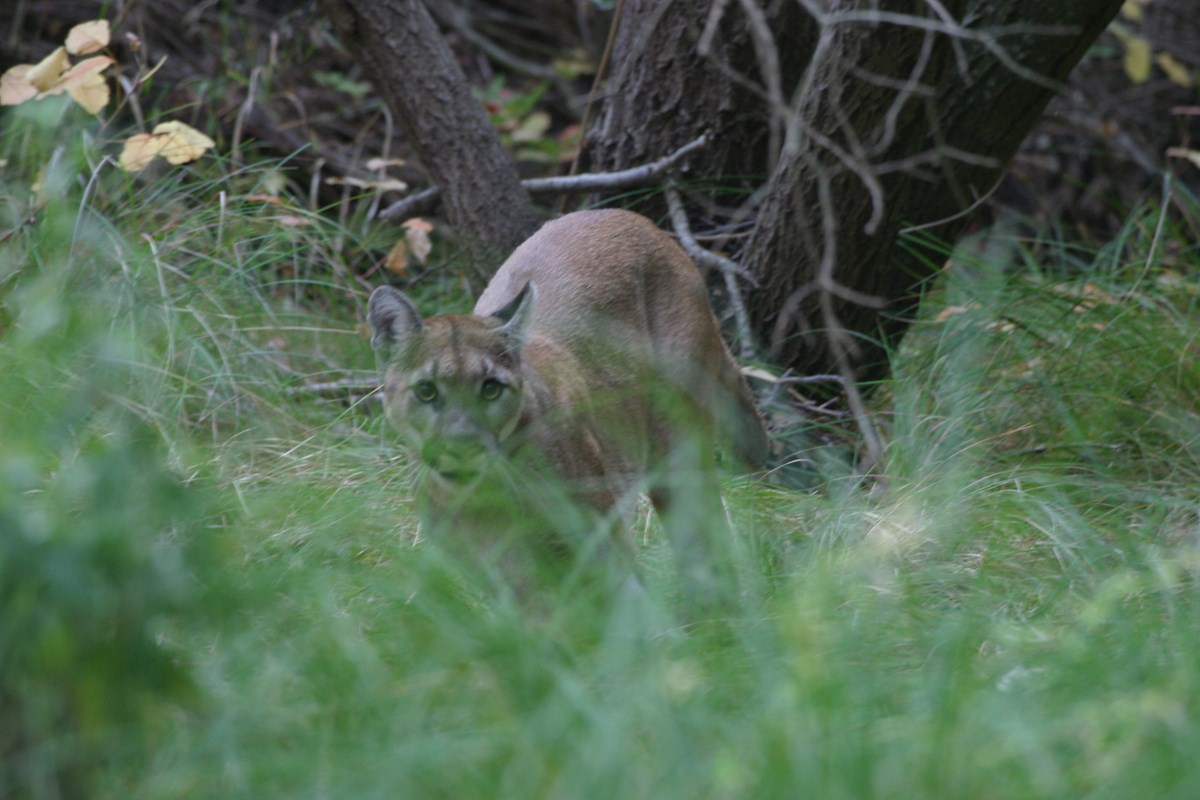
- P-2 in the Santa Monica Mountains
- Other names: P-002; Puma 2
- Species: Cougar (Puma concolor)
- Sex: Female
- Died: August 2005; Santa Monica Mountains
- Cause of death: killed by P-1
- Residence: Santa Monica Mountains
- Mate: P-1
- Offspring: P-5, P-6, P-7, P-8, P-9, and at least one other
- Weight: 80 lb (36 kg)

P-2 (unknown – August 2005) was a wild mountain lion who resided in the Santa Monica Mountains. P-2 was the first female and mother tracked in a 20+ year, 100+ animal study in the area.

== Life ==
P-2 mated with P-1, the dominant male in the Santa Monica Mountains, at least twice. The first known mating occurred some time before 2002 and produced at least two offspring: P-9 and another. The second mating occurred in the summer of 2004 and produced four offspring: P-5, P-6, P-7, and P-8.

In August 2005, approximately eleven months after P-5, P-6, P-7, and P-8 were born, P-2 began considerably expanding her range, presumably to show her offspring areas for dispersal. Shortly after, P-2 was killed by P-1, something researchers believe was done either in a fight over food or more likely because she was protecting her children from P-1. P-5, P-6, P-7, and P-8 all dispersed after their mother's death, but even so, P-5 and P-7 were killed by P-1 the following year, as was P-8 by P-9. Fathers killing their male offspring is common amongst mountain lions, although killing a mate or a daughter as P-1 did is not. Researchers believe this behavior is exacerbated by the Santa Monica Mountains, where the land is fragmented and locked-in.

P-2 weighed 80 pounds (36 kg) while her mate and killer P-1 weighed 150 pounds (68 kg).

== See also ==
- List of wild animals from Los Angeles
- Mountain lions in the Santa Monica Mountains
- Cougar–human interactions
