= Evolutionary rescue =

Evolutionary rescue is a process by which a population—that would have gone extinct in the absence of evolution—persists due to natural selection acting on heritable variation. Coined by Gomulkiewicz and Holt in 1995, evolutionary rescue was described as a continuously changing environment predicted to appear as a stable lag of the mean trait value behind a moving environmental optimum, where the rate of evolution and change in the environment are equal. Evolutionary rescue is often confused with two other commonplace forms of rescue—genetic rescue and demographic rescue—in nature due to overlapping similarities. Figure 1 highlights the different pathways that result in their respective rescue.

== History ==
The earliest recorded observation of the concept of evolutionary rescue was made by English philosophers Haldane in 1937 and Simpson who tossed around the idea of how populations might evolve in response to changes in their environment. In 1995, Gomulkiewicz & Holt observed the population dynamics of two processes: the exponential decline of sensitive types and the exponential increase in resistant types. Orr & Unckless (2014) then furthered Gomulkiewicz & Holt's work by describing these processes together to create the U-shaped abundance trajectory. In the changing world, evolutionary rescue is described as the phenotypes/genotypes of a population adapting to its environment under the threat of extinction by increasing the frequency of adaptive alleles.

== The U-shaped curve ==
After a sudden change in the environment, evolutionary rescue is predicted to create a U-shaped curve of population dynamics, as the original genotypes, which are unable to replace themselves, are replaced by genotypes that are able to increase in numbers. The left half of the curve predicts the declining original genotypes that are unable to replace themselves, and the right half of the curve predicts resistant genotypes that can increase the population number. The probability of evolutionary rescue is dependent on the resistant allele originating before or after the environmental change. In a continuously changing environment, evolutionary rescue is predicted to appear as a stable lag of the mean trait value behind a moving environmental optimum, where the rate of evolution and rate of change in the environment are equal. The theory has been reviewed by Alexander et al in 2014 and continues to grow rapidly, adding both genetic and ecological complexity.

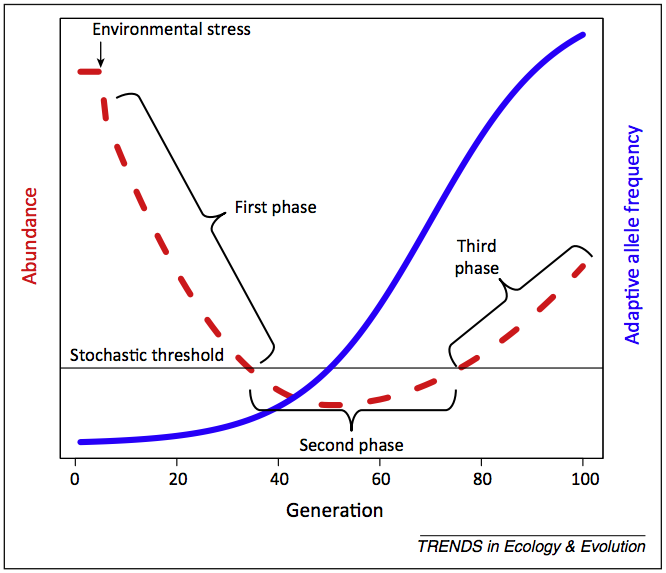
Evolutionary rescue is expected to produce a U-shaped curve of population dynamics after a sudden change in the environment, as genotypes that are unable replace themselves are replaced by those that can. Figure from

Evolutionary rescue is distinct from demographic rescue, where a population is sustained by continuous migration from elsewhere, without the need for evolution. On the other hand, genetic rescue, where a population persists because of migration that reduces inbreeding depression, can be thought of a special case of evolutionary rescue (but see).

== Genetic factors ==
For a population to undergo evolutionary rescue, the frequency of resistance alleles being present dictates the probability of evolutionary rescue occurring. Natural populations threatened by extinction are under stress by invasive pests or pathogens that have increased resistance to pesticides and antibiotics. These populations may also be constrained by the genetic variation present because of the lack of sufficiently resistant alleles being able to propagate. This results in the absence of the third phase of the U-shaped curve leading to extirpation.

=== Recombination (Epistasis) ===
Recombination either increases or decreases the probability of evolutionary rescue from occurring. Epistasis then modifies the recombination by creating linkage disequilibria (LD). Together, the linkage allows the recombination of two beneficial alleles to enhance the fitness of that population, thus giving rise to adaptations that succeed in evolutionary rescue. In evolutionary rescue, sudden environmental changes affect the epistasis of alleles in the population. As such, negative epistasis (the removal of a resistant allele via mutation) means LD is negative, therefore lowering the chances of evolutionary rescue from occurring. Similarly, if epistasis is positive (the introduction of a resistant allele), LD is also positive meaning the probability of evolutionary rescue increases.

=== Dispersal ===
The limitation of dispersal occurring in a population is dependent on the compatibility of the habitat being dispersed in terms of climate conditions, geographic accessibility, and more. Populations in relocated habitats with abundant genotypes to adapt to their environment have increased chances of surviving by undergoing evolutionary rescue.

As populations disperse, their population's distribution range of genetic information increases, which allows the gene flow of beneficial alleles to spread between the new sub-populations of the species. Within each sub-population increases the probability of local adaptation (beneficial alleles appearing within the genotype) and thus gene flow from one sub-population to another increases the chances of that beneficial allele propagating and successfully triggering evolutionary rescue.

Dispersal, however, also negatively affects the local adaptation of a population under heterogeneous environmental conditions through maladaptation. Mismatched genotypes increase the migration load of the population resulting in a much lower overall fitness.

== Extrinsic factors ==
=== Human impact ===
Destruction of natural habitats by human influence limits the ability of a population to increase and disperse, thus interrupting evolutionary rescue from succeeding. Urbanization, agriculture, and transport roads of habitats increase the risk of extirpation of the local populations. As a result, constraints of the environment pressures local species to adapt or die out.

== Empirical evidence ==
Evolutionary rescue has been demonstrated in many different experimental evolution studies, such as yeast evolving to tolerate previously lethal salt concentrations. There are also a large number of examples of evolutionary rescue in the wild, in the forms of drug resistance, herbicide resistance, other types of pesticide resistance, and genetic rescue.
