= Woolsey Fire =

2018 wildfire in Southern California

- Part of the 2018 California wildfires
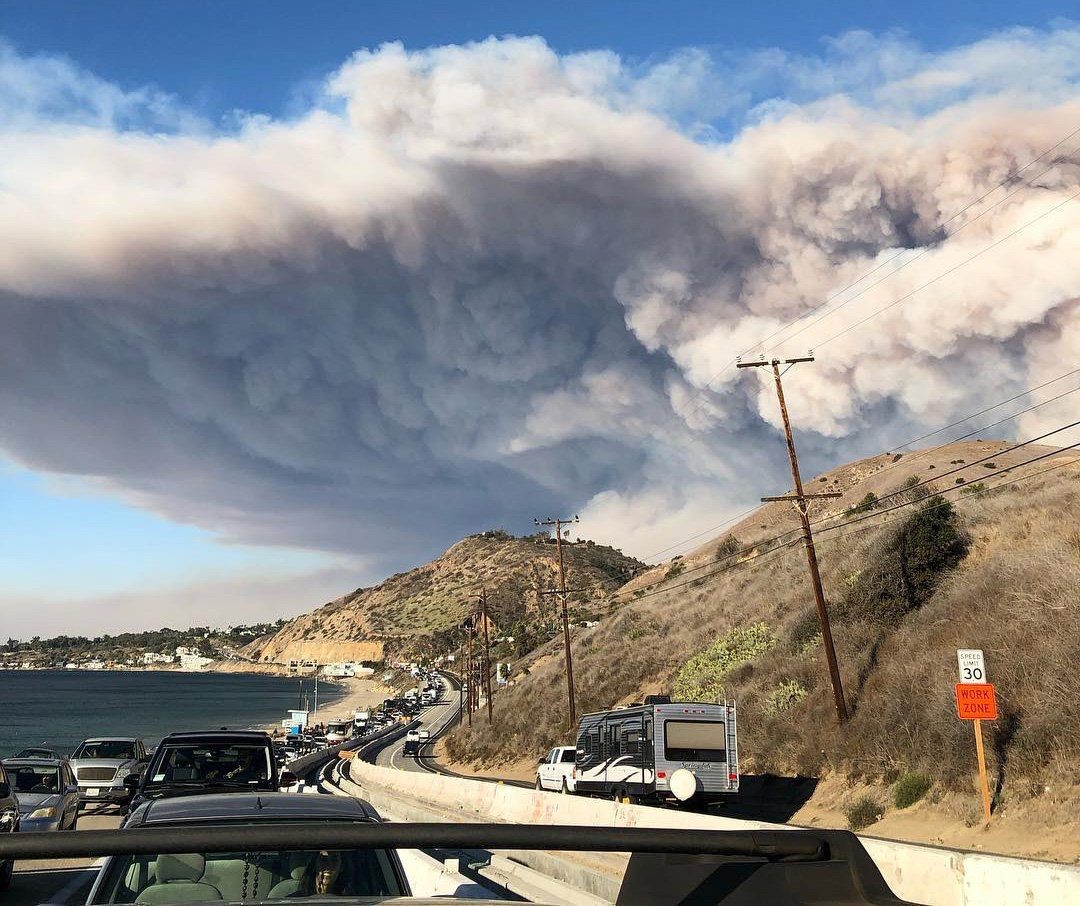
- The large smoke plume from the fire encroaching on Malibu on November 9, seen from the Pacific Coast Highway
- Date: November 8, 2018 –; November 21, 2018
- Location: Los Angeles and Ventura Counties, California, United States
- Coordinates: 34.2350°N 118.7013°W

Statistics
- Burned area: 96,949 acres (39,234 ha)
- Land use: Recreational and residential

Impacts
- Deaths: 3 civilians
- Injuries: 2 civilians 3 firefighters
- Structures lost: 1,643
- Cost: $6 billion (2018 USD)

Ignition
- Cause: Faulty SoCal Edison Equipment

Map
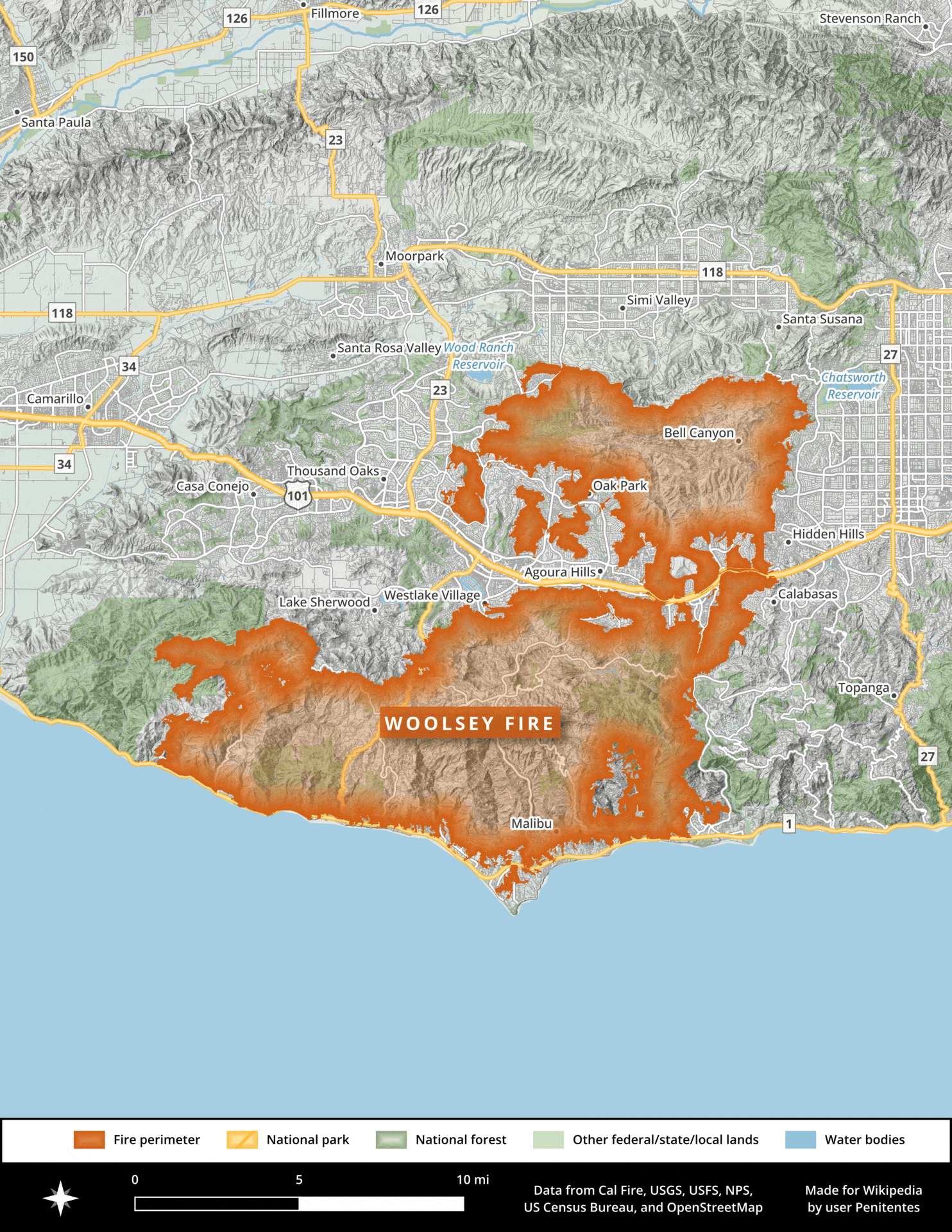
- The extent of the Woolsey Fire

- Location within the United States Location within California Location within the Los Angeles metropolitan area

The 2018 Woolsey Fire was a large, deadly, and destructive wildfire in Los Angeles and Ventura counties, California. The fire ignited on November 8 and was not fully contained until November 21. During that period the fire spread to 96,949 acres (39,234 hectares), destroyed 1,643 structures, killed three people, and prompted the evacuation of more than 295,000 people. It was one of several fires in California—including the nearby Hill Fire and the even more impactful Camp Fire in Butte County—that ignited on the same day.

The fire started in Woolsey Canyon on the Santa Susana Field Laboratory property, and burned 80 percent of the site, a complex of industrial research and development buildings belonging to Boeing, in the Santa Susana Mountains above the Simi Valley near the boundary between Los Angeles and Ventura counties. The Santa Ana winds, which often are a factor for Southern California fires, pushed the fire in a southerly direction throughout the first day. The Ventura Freeway (US 101) between the San Fernando Valley and the Conejo Valley was closed as the fire crossed and headed into the rugged Santa Monica Mountains.

The fire raced through the chaparral-covered steep canyons where it encountered historic movie and TV sets, small ranches, and the houses of celebrities. Hundreds of houses in Malibu were destroyed or damaged on both sides of Pacific Coast Highway (SR 1). Many of these were on Point Dume that juts out from the narrow coastal terrace that lies between the mountains and the Pacific Ocean. The mitigation measures Pepperdine University had in place successfully protected the campus, with students sheltering in place, to the south. The entire sparsely populated portion of the Malibu coast west to the community of Solromar, which includes state and national parklands, suffered damage from the fire. The fire cost at least $6 billion (2018 USD) in property damage.

Thousands of residents were kept away from their houses in numerous neighborhoods along the Ventura Freeway and the communities along the Malibu coast. The evacuations frustrated residents as they lasted for many days as the fire continued to threaten houses especially when the winds increased and fanned the flames. The evacuated residents were incrementally allowed to return to see if their houses were damaged or destroyed as the fire continued to spread through the rugged wilderness at the western end of the Santa Monica Mountains. Authorities in many of the damaged communities declared that they needed to prevent residents from returning quickly as neighborhoods were crowded with crews repairing downed power lines and other hazardous conditions. In the months after the fire, residents criticized what they thought was a slow and inadequate response by cities and counties during public meetings held by public officials.

While this and other fires were burning, President Donald Trump blamed poor forest management by the state. One fire scientist explained that forest management (good or bad) had a minor influence on the severity of the fires, and that Woolsey was not a forest fire.

The California Public Utilities Commission is investigating an equipment problem near the point of origin reported by Southern California Edison.

== Timeline ==
At 2:22 p.m. PST on November 8, Southern California Edison reported an outage on the Big Rock 16 kV circuit out of the Chatsworth substation on the Santa Susana Field Laboratory property, south of Simi Valley, Ventura County, California. At 2:24 p.m. PST a brush fire was reported in the same location. The first firefighters arrived almost 20 minutes later, a Ventura County engine carrying three firefighters from the Simi Valley station about eight miles (13 km) away. Ventura County had heavily dedicated crews to the Hill Fire burning near Newbury Park. The nearest fire crew, part of a private company contracted to protect Santa Susana Field Laboratory, a Boeing Company facility nearby, was delayed by its engine breaking down. Powerful Santa Ana winds, reaching 50 to 60 mph (80 to 97 km/h), caused the fire to spread rapidly and beyond firefighting capabilities. During the overnight hours into the early morning of November 9, the fire crossed U.S. Route 101 near Calabasas and spread through Liberty Canyon in Agoura Hills. Aerial suppression of the fire was unable to commence until 5:00 a.m. PST, November 9, when winds lessened enough.

On the morning of November 9, Assistant L.A. County Fire Chief Williams told KBUU-LP that his request for 70 strike teams had been denied. The blaze spread rapidly throughout the day burning through the mountains and along the 101 Freeway, eventually reaching Pacific Coast Highway in Malibu by the afternoon devastating numerous houses there. Firefighters and firetrucks who did not know the area were reported idle by many frustrated citizens. Several homeowners stayed despite the mandatory evacuation to defend their houses. Pepperdine University in Malibu recommended that students shelter in place in specific buildings on campus rather than use the crowded highway to evacuate. Farther north, the flames spread to portions of Thousand Oaks, Bell Canyon, Westlake Village, Oak Park and the West Hills neighborhood of Los Angeles forcing residential evacuations and the closure of numerous business and corporate offices in the region. On the day before the Hill and Woolsey fires started, residents in the Conejo Valley experienced the shooting of thirteen people in a bar including a police officer and the perpetrator. As the fires threatened the community and otherwise disrupted their routine, memorial services had to be postponed.

By November 9, Cal Fire and the United States Forest Service were also helping local services with the fire. This resulted in 3,242 firefighters being deployed to contain the blaze by the morning of November 10. The fire had engulfed more than 70,000 acres (28,000 hectares) of land, forcing the evacuation of an estimated 295,000 people from 105,000 residences. This included an unprecedented total evacuation of Bell Canyon, Malibu, Agoura Hills, Malibou Lake, and Oak Park.

Before sunrise on November 14, the fire flared up in rugged wilderness at the western end of the Santa Monica Mountains with winds blowing strongly. The fire burned well away from populated neighborhoods, but was threatening scattered home sites. The flare-up sent a huge column of smoke over Point Mugu and out to sea.

By November 21 at 6:11 p.m. PST, the fire was 100 percent contained.

== Impacts ==
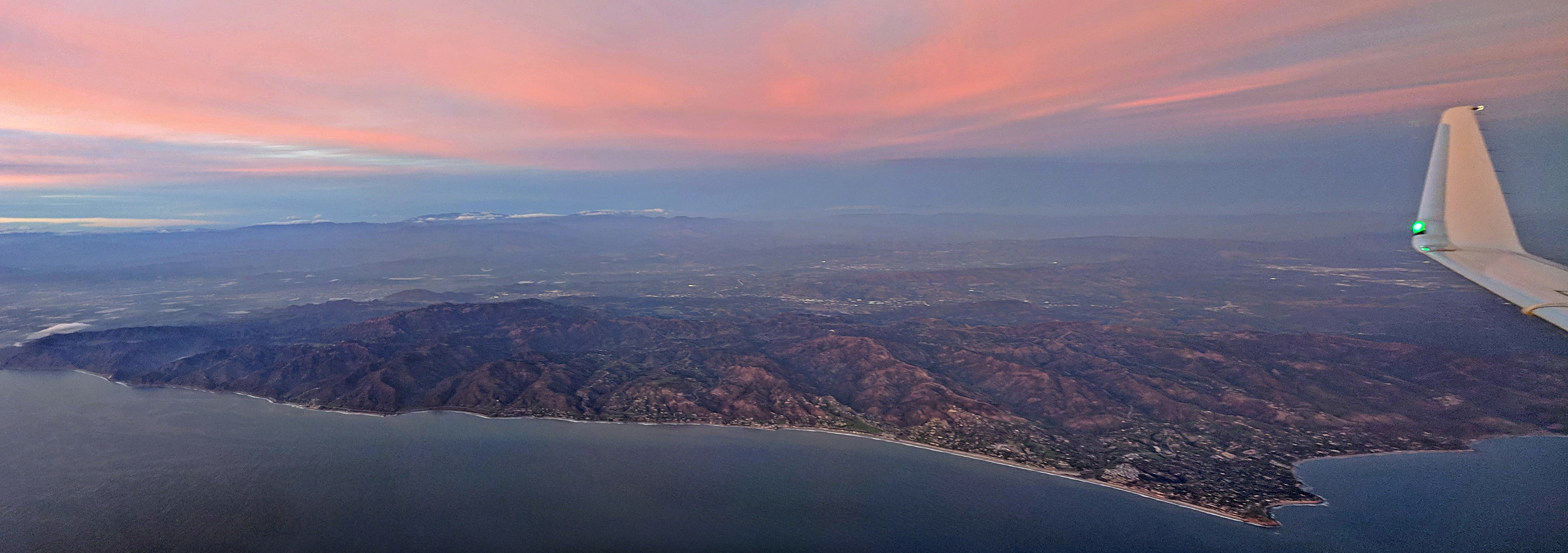
The burn scar of the fire in and above Malibu in a January 2019 aerial view.

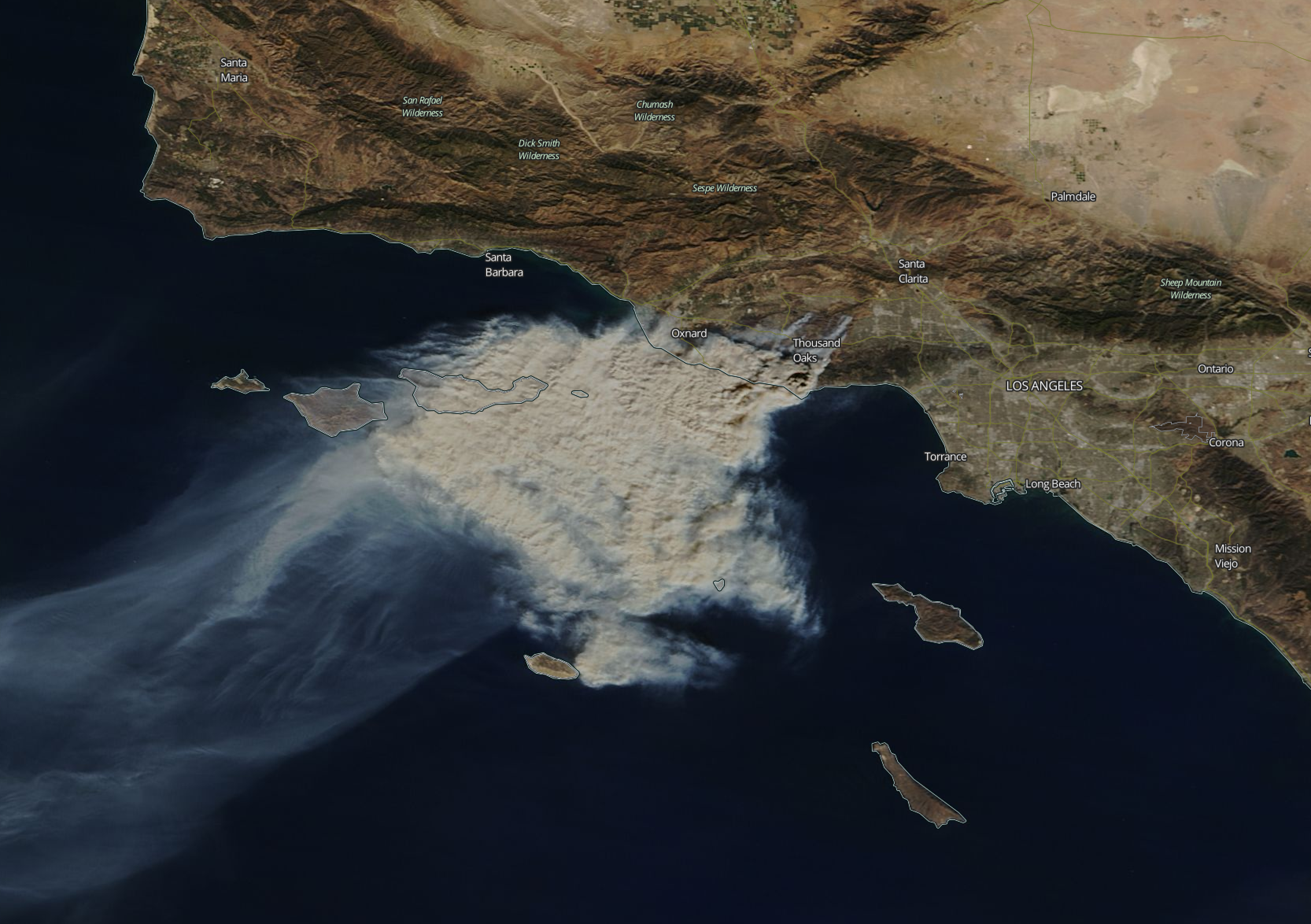
Satellite image of the fire on November 9. The majority of western Malibu is engulfed by smoke and fire at the time of this image, with the blaze spreading into Thousand Oaks.

Many of the public and private parks and trails within the Santa Monica Mountains National Recreation Area were closed indefinitely as damage due to the fire was being evaluated and necessary remediation measures were put in place. Closures included Malibu Creek State Park and Zuma Beach. Property owned by the federal government within the national recreation area includes some developed parks and large undeveloped tracts of land. The fire caused trails to be shut for months as 88 percent of the federal parkland was burned. The fire created a challenge to native plants as black mustard with bright yellow flowers quickly established itself post-fire. Thirteen mountain lions with radio collars were within the fire area according to National Park Service researchers. One, P-74, was killed by the fire, while another, P-64, was found dead and with burnt paws shortly after. Repairs were needed to the Ventura Freeway at the proposed location of the Wallis Annenberg Wildlife Crossing designed to benefit the mountain lions.

Two people were found dead in a vehicle on Mulholland Highway in Malibu. Emergency personnel were unable to reach the victims when a report of a critical burn victim was relayed, due to downed power lines. On Tuesday, November 13, a third victim was discovered in the 32000 block of Lobo Canyon Road in Agoura Hills. The Los Angeles County Sheriff's Department announced on January 22, 2019, that charred human remains had been found in the burn area in Malibu and that homicide detectives were trying to determine if the victim had been killed in the flames or had met with foul play.

The fire destroyed 1643 structures and damaged 364, including at least 1600 houses destroyed by the fire. Several celebrities were among those who lost their houses, and multiple filming locations and historical sites were directly impacted by the fire, including Paramount Ranch, Peter Strauss Ranch, the former Reagan Ranch now part of Malibu Creek State Park, and the lower house of Villa De La Vina, the mansion where The Bachelor and The Bachelorette are filmed. The numerous drug rehabilitation centers and sober living houses in Malibu that have given rise to the nickname "Rehab Riviera" were evacuated ahead of the fire. At least two were destroyed or significantly damaged. Three Jewish summer camps JCA Shalom, Gindling Hilltop, and Camp Hess Kramer were almost completely devastated in the fire. There were two cases of looting in Ventura County, one of which resulted in a car chase.

Reporters and officials rescued animals from houses, and brought them to shelters and vets. Other animals at locations such as Malibu Wines were either evacuated or cared for at the locations. Local fire officials opened Zuma Beach as an evacuation point for large animals, with pictures by the Los Angeles Times, showing llamas, alpacas, and horses tied to lifeguard stations and poles.

Clean up of materials like asbestos, pesticides, plastics, and electronic devices began almost immediately after the flames were out. The ruins of burned homes and vehicles can have a harmful impact on the surrounding environment.

== Responses ==
On November 10, President Donald Trump, stated poor forest management by the state of California as the cause of the Woolsey Fire and the concurrent Camp Fire. In a controversial tweet, the President threatened to end federal assistance unless the state improves its "gross mismanagement of the forests".

The small groves of California sycamores and coast live oaks amidst the sage and chaparral covered hillsides in the area of the fire are not considered to be forests as commonly understood by the public or wildfire experts. Since these small, critical habitats are not logged, President Trump's statements had little relevance to the Southern California fire.

The firemen's union disagreed with President Trump's claims, noting that California experienced unusually dry conditions and abnormally high fire danger at the time. Brian Rice, president of the California Professional Firefighters, described Trump's assertion about the state's forest management practices as "dangerously wrong", noting that 60 percent of California forests are directly managed by the federal government, which has reduced spending on forestry in recent years.

=== In public meetings ===
In public meetings, people affected by the fire were critical of the slow and inadequate response of the Los Angeles County Fire Department, the Los Angeles County Sheriff's Department and California Highway Patrol and their poor handling of the evacuation, and the city of Malibu and their lack of preparation and overall response during and after the fire.

== Investigations ==
California Public Utilities Commission launched a probe into Southern California Edison who reported a problem with their transmission grid at the point of origin two minutes before the start of the fire. The redacted version of the Ventura County Fire Department Woolsey report, released in October 2020, concluded that the fire was started by electrical equipment associated with the Big Rock 16kV circuit that is owned and operated by Southern California Edison.

A 2019 Los Angeles County report on missteps in the government's handling of the Woolsey Fire response (the 'Woolsey Report') cited the unavailability of firefighting units in Western Malibu during critical times of the fire, where hundreds of houses were lost. The report stated: "a significant number of requests by political figures to check on specific addresses of homes to ensure their protection distracted from Department leadership to accomplish priority objectives" which included a personal request to the city fire chief by Los Angeles mayor Eric Garcetti.

Amidst the coronavirus pandemic in March 2020, Alex Villanueva, Los Angeles County Sheriff, was removed from his position as head of county emergency operations by the Los Angeles County Board of Supervisors due to the poor emergency response reported by investigators in the Woolsey Report.

Scientists analyzed coastal water quality and found unusually high levels of fecal bacteria and sediment that remained for months.

=== Possible contamination from Santa Susana Field Laboratory ===
The Santa Susana Field Laboratory site has been undergoing a cleanup of the contamination from a partial nuclear meltdown in 1959 and extensive rocket engine testing. After the fire, the Los Angeles County Department of Public Health found "no discernible level of radiation in the tested area" and the California Department of Toxic Substances Control, which is overseeing cleanup of the site, said in an interim report that "previously handled radioactive and hazardous materials were not affected by the fire." Bob Dodge, President of Physicians for Social Responsibility-Los Angeles, said "When it burns and becomes airborne in smoke and ash, there is real possibility of heightened exposure for area residents."

In 2019, Risk Assessment Corporation (RAC) conducted soil sampling surrounding the SSFL, and performed source term estimation, atmospheric transport, and deposition modeling. The study reports published in 2023, concluded, “Air measurement data collected during the Woolsey Fire, along with atmospheric dispersion modeling and an offsite soil sampling program designed specifically to look for impacts from the fire, showed no evidence of SSFL impact in offsite soils because of the Woolsey Fire. No anthropogenic radionuclides were measured at levels above those expected from global fallout. The soil sampling confirmed that no detectable levels of SSFL-derived radionuclides migrated from SSFL at the locations sampled because of the Woolsey Fire or from past operations of the SSFL.”

In 2020, the California Department of Toxic Substances Control (DTSC) stated in their final report that the fire did not cause contaminants to be released from the site into Simi Valley and other neighboring communities and that the risk from smoke exposure during the fire was not higher than what is normally associated with wildfire.

In 2021, a study which collected 360 samples of dust, ash, and soils from homes and public lands three weeks after the fire found that most samples were at normal levels, ("Data did not support a finding of widespread deposition of radioactive particles.") but that two locations "contained high activities of radioactive isotopes associated with the Santa Susana Field Laboratory."

== See also ==
- 2018 California wildfires
- List of California wildfires
- List of fires
- Camp Fire, a concurrent destructive wildfire in northern California
- Palisades Fire
- Clampitt Fire, a wildfire that had a similar burn path in 1970.
