= Wallis Annenberg Wildlife Crossing =

Wildlife overpass spanning US Route 101 in Ventura County, California

- RCDSMM's conceptual image of the wildlife crossing
- Coordinates: 34.138°N 118.729°W
- Carries: Wildlife
- Crosses: US 101 (Ventura Freeway)
- Locale: Agoura Hills, California
- Other name: Liberty Canyon Wildlife Crossing

Characteristics
- Total length: 200 feet (61 m)
- Width: 165 feet (50 m)

Location
- Interactive map of Wallis Annenberg Wildlife Crossing

The Wallis Annenberg Wildlife Crossing is a vegetated overpass system under construction in Agoura Hills, California, at Liberty Canyon. Originally called the Liberty Canyon Wildlife Crossing, the overpass will be a critical wildlife crossing, spanning the ten-lane Ventura Freeway, connecting the Simi Hills with the isolated Santa Monica Mountains. The first in the California highway system designed specifically for wildlife connectivity, the project includes two bridges, earthwork, and 13 acres (5.3 ha) of habitat restoration. Its official opening is set for December 2, 2026.

Species expected to benefit from the crossing include mountain lions, bobcats, coyotes, gray foxes, birds of prey, skunks, rodents, American badgers, American black bears, fence lizards, and mule deer.

== Background ==
Beginning in the late 20th century, the Santa Monica Mountains's mountain lion population declined and became genetically isolated, primarily because the Ventura Freeway prevented them from moving between the mountains and the Simi Hills to the north. Since 2002, at least a dozen mountain lions have been killed on the freeway (as has one black bear). GPS tracking collars show that most approach the freeway then turn back; only one was able to repeatedly cross. In 2020, biologists found the first evidence of physical abnormalities in the isolated population, an indication of inbreeding.

One solution to habitat fragmentation is wildlife crossings, which enable animals to move past barriers created by human development, allowing newcomers to bring new genetic material to the area and those born in the area to leave.

The problem was already evident in 1990, when the Santa Monica Mountains Conservancy commissioned a study to identify the best location for a crossing of the Ventura Freeway. Scientists identified Liberty Canyon, about 35 miles (56 km) northwest of downtown Los Angeles. The site sits along a wildlife corridor within the Santa Monica Mountains National Recreation Area, which consists of thousands of acres of local, state, and federally protected lands that stretch from Los Angeles into Ventura County.

== Design ==
In 2015, the Resource Conservation District of the Santa Monica Mountains published a design for a 165-foot-wide (50 m) and 200-foot-long (61 m) overpass for the wildlife crossing. To encourage use by wildlife, the bridge will have lush but drought-tolerant vegetation with matte materials to deflect bright headlights and insulation to quiet the roar of cars. Fencing at each end will help funnel them onto the crossing. A second phase of the project will cross a frontage road that is parallel with the freeway.

The project's landscaping includes not just the nearly 1-acre (0.40 ha) bridge, but also 12 acres (4.9 ha) of habitat restoration in the area. The restoration is partially needed because the 2018 Woolsey Fire burned through the wildlife corridor as it was pushed by strong Santa Ana winds in a southerly direction, and crossed the freeway in this area.

The draft environmental document was released in 2017. A tunnel was considered as an alternative, but it would attract less wildlife and wouldn’t sustain vegetation. The California Department of Transportation (Caltrans) oversaw design and construction as it crosses a major transportation route.

The final design consists of two structures: one bridge above the 101 Freeway, 250 by 174 feet (76 by 53 m); and one above Agoura Road, 71 by 175 feet (22 by 53 m). The combined surface area is 55,925 sq ft (5,196 sq.m).

== Funding campaign ==
In 2014, the National Wildlife Federation, the Santa Monica Mountains Fund, and the #SaveLACougars campaign began to raise money for the project. The inspiration for the project, as well as the funding drive's "poster puma", was P-22, a mountain lion that survived crossing two freeways, the 101 and the 405, to reach Griffith Park at the easterly end of the Santa Monica Mountains. P-22 became a local celebrity; his death in 2022 would further stimulate awareness and funds for the campaign.

In 2014, the California Wildlife Conservation Board gave $650,000 to the Resource Conservation District of the Santa Monica Mountains for the design of the crossing.

In 2015, the California Coastal Commission gave a $1 million grant to Caltrans for environmental assessment. Private donors were encouraged to contribute. The project stalled for years due to lack of funding. In May 2021, the Annenberg Foundation pledged to donate another $25 million once the project raised $35 million. As of mid-April 2022, donations totaled more than $87 million, with more than 5,000 people, foundations, agencies, and businesses contributing expertise and donations.

The project cost around $90 million, with funding from private donations covering about 60% and the rest coming from public funds set aside for conservation purposes.

In February 2026, Governor Newsom announced that an additional $18 million would be provided by California from general funds in addition to the funds allocated by the California Transportation Commission from the Environmental Enhancement and Mitigation Program.

== Construction ==
The crossing under construction in September 2025

A groundbreaking ceremony was held on Earth Day in April 2022 with Governor Gavin Newsom, Wallis Annenberg, wildlife biologists, and members of the public along with local, state, and federal legislators. Caltrans set the beginning of construction for spring 2022 with construction to be completed within two years. Initial work included moving public utilities. A delay to construction was announced in 2024 due to flooding.

The project is a joint public and private effort funded by the Annenberg Foundation, private donations, and state and local donations. By early 2026, the construction project was $21 million over budget due to a variety of factors. Project managers and public advocates for the project stated that it was delayed, first citing record rainfall in the 2022–2023 California floods, which interrupted ground-compaction work which had to be redone in 2023, and then subsequently after the February 2024 California atmospheric rivers event.

Managers also stated that tariffs imposed by the Trump administration caused cost overruns, as materials required to build the bridge were sourced from overseas and thus subject to tariffs, raising their prices. SFGate also cited the National Highway Construction Cost Index, calculated by the Federal Highway Administration to track the change in construction of highways increased by 60% across the board.

As of April 2026, the work was expected to finish by November 2026.

By November 18, 2026, wildlife cameras had recorded a coyote crossing the bridge ahead of the official opening ceremony scheduled for December 2.
