= Depredation permit =

A depredation permit allows a person in the U.S. to shoot certain birds and animals on their own property to protect crops, livestock, or domestic animals according to various rules and regulations. The U.S. Federal Government allows depredation permits for migratory birds on farmland. In the state of Florida deer depredation permits are granted to farmers. California has regulations for bear and bobcat depredation permits. Wild pigs and mountain lion and beavers have also been targeted by depredation permits.

In 2019, NOAA proposed issuing depredation permits for the kill of more than 400 Steller sea lions and California sea lions in Oregon because they are said to be eating too many fish. Depredation permits allowing bow hunting of white-tailed deer are considered a population control method in Suffolk County, New York.
