= Wildlife radio telemetry =

Tool to track the movement and behavior of animals

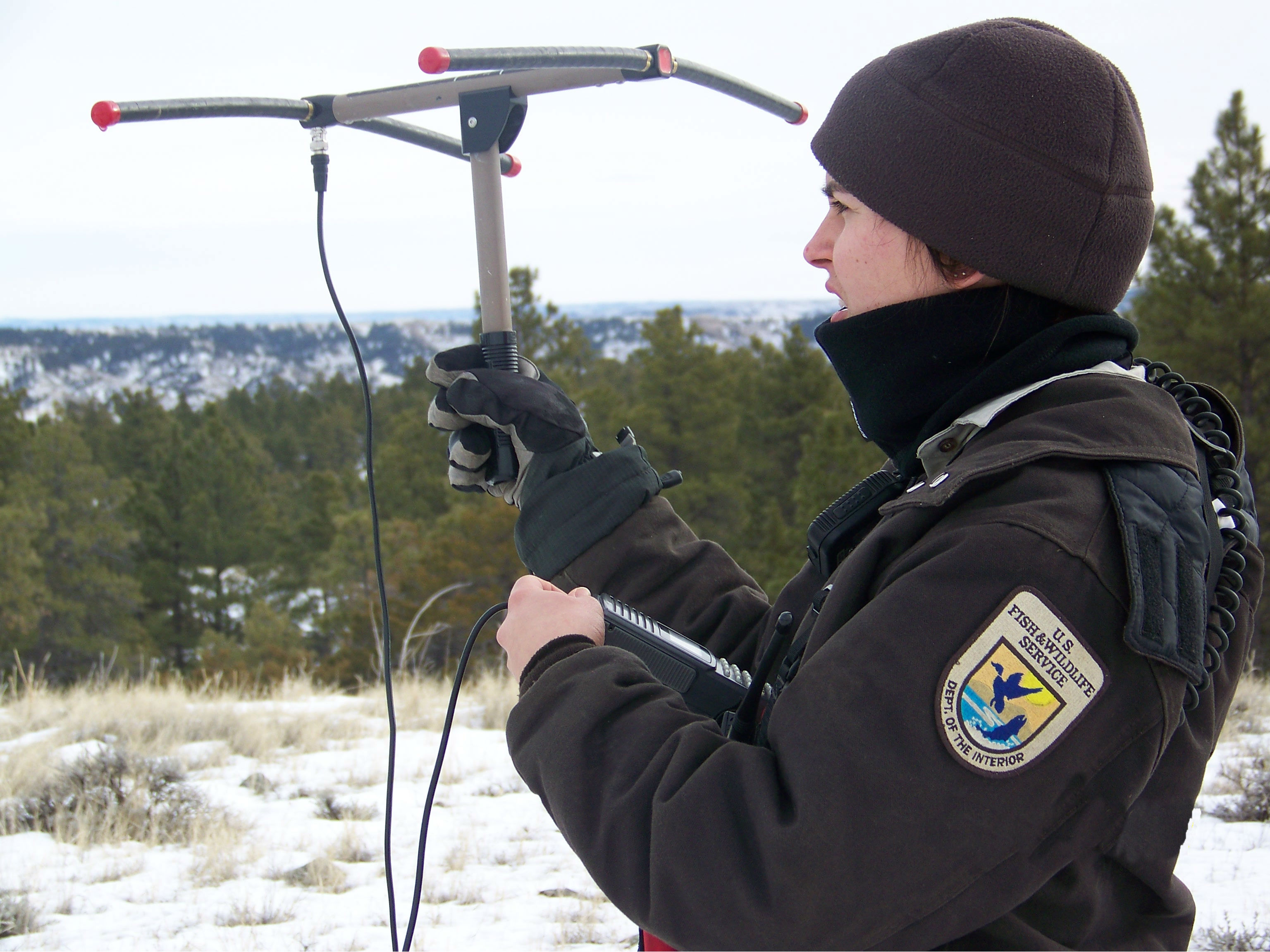
A U.S. Fish & Wildlife employee uses radio telemetry to track mountain lions.

Wildlife radio telemetry is a tool used to track the movement and behavior of animals. This technique uses the transmission of radio signals to locate a transmitter attached to the animal of interest. It is often used to obtain location data on the animal's preferred habitat, home range, and to understand population dynamics. The different types of radio telemetry techniques include very high frequency (VHF) transmitters, global positioning system (GPS) tracking, and satellite tracking. Recent advances in technology have improved radio telemetry techniques by increasing the efficacy of data collection. However, studies involving radio telemetry should be reviewed in order to determine whether newer techniques, such as collars that transmit the location to the operator via satellites, are actually required to accomplish the goals of the study.

== Transmitters ==
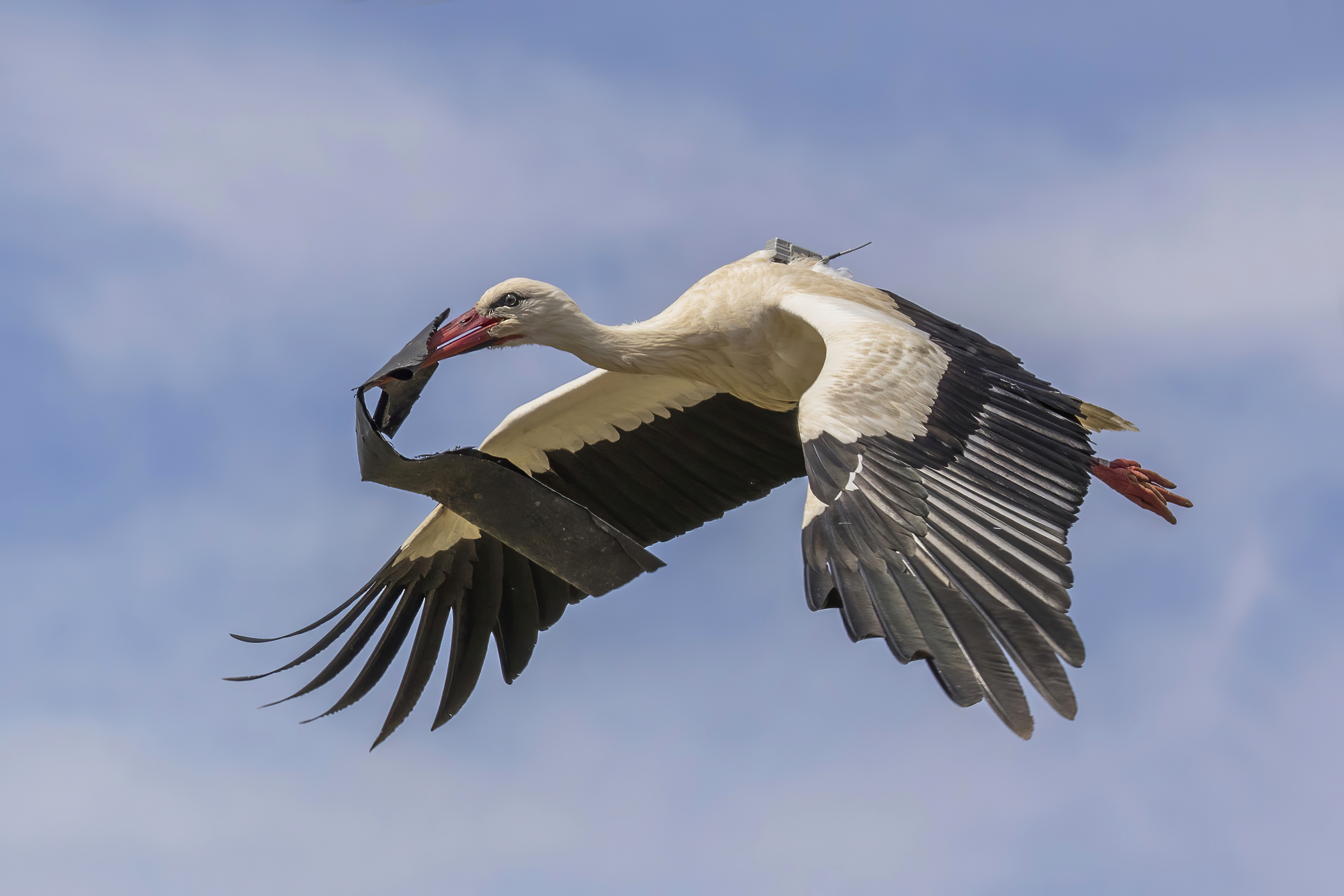
White stork (Ciconia ciconia) with a transmitter on its back

The operator attaches a transmitter to an animal that gives off unique electromagnetic radio signals, which allows the animal to be located. Transmitters are available in a variety of forms and consist of an antenna, a power source, and the electronics required to produce a signal. Transmitters are chosen based on the behavior, size, and life history of the specific species being studied. In order to reduce the impact of the transmitter on the animal's behavior and quality of life, transmitters typically weigh no more than five percent of the animal's body weight. However, the smaller the transmitter, the weaker and shorter-lived it is. Transmitters are often designed to fall off the animal at the conclusion of the study due to the unlikelihood of recapturing the tagged animals. Large animals require transmitters in the form of collars, which leave room for the animal to grow without falling off. Ear tag transmitters are commonly attached to the ear of large animals that have changing neck sizes. Lightweight, adhesive transmitters are glued to the backs of smaller animals, such as bats. Necklace packs are transmitters that fit around the neck of upland game birds. Subcutaneous transmitters are applied to aquatic animals, which allow them to freely navigate underwater. In some species of fish that have ceased feeding, transmitters are inserted inside the animal's body cavity as a means to minimize the stress of tagging. Whip antennas are an omni-directional transmitter design that produces more signal over a greater distance. A harness loop antenna design, implemented for small birds, involves a transmitter being wrapped around the body.

== Receivers ==
The operator uses an antenna that is attached to a receiver, which is programmed to the transmitter's frequency, to pick up the electromagnetic signals given off by the transmitter affixed to the target animal. Receiver antennas may be hand-held or mounted on an object, and they are available in a variety of forms and functions. These antennas are also tuned to the proper frequency for the transmitter. The receiver produces a tone that increases in loudness or has a visual signal strength indicator that pulses as the operator approaches the transmitter. Omnidirectional antennas have no additional elements and are used to determine the presence or absence of a signal, not its exact location. Elements are added segments of an antenna to increase the range of detectability of the receiver. Adcock antennas consist of two elements and are used to locate the direction of the signal. Loop antennas are small and useful for locating low frequency transmitters. The Yagi antenna contains 3 or 4 elements and is a strong, directional antenna commonly used to determine the location of a transmitter. Antennas can also be affixed to towers. This allows the antenna to be positioned higher, avoiding interference from buildings and trees. Boat, aircraft, and vehicle-mounted antennas allow the operator to exploit a larger area while tracking.

== Tracking animals ==
Direct tracking and triangulation methods allow the operator to locate a tagged animal. Direct or VHF tracking involves using a directional antenna to follow the signal given off by the transmitter to the exact location of the tagged animal. The operator rotates the antenna until the loudest signal is found. The operator follows the signal, checking the direction of the signal frequently until he or she reaches the tagged animal. Triangulation is often used when an animal is on private or inaccessible property because it allows the operator to remotely determine the location of the tagged animal. The operator obtains three or more azimuths or bearings from locations around the signal and calculates the intersection of the azimuths to estimate the location of the transmitted animal. Global positioning tracking involves a receiver that picks up signals from satellites to determine the location of a transmitted animal over time. The GPS transmitter is attached to an animal and records the location of the animal on the device by estimating the time taken for radio signals from at least three satellites to travel to the GPS transmitter. The data is collected by recapturing the animal to remove the GPS transmitter or remotely downloading the data off the transmitter. These units are often heavier and shorter-lived than the ones used for VHF tracking. Global positioning tracking is useful for migrating animals because their locations can accurately be determined, regardless of the distance they are from the operator. Satellite tracking is similar to GPS tracking and allows animal movement to be tracked globally. This form of tracking is useful for remote or inaccessible areas. Many of these systems implement platform terminal transmitters (PTT) that send electromagnetic signals to Argos equipment found on satellites. The Argos receivers estimate the distance to the transmitter to determine its location. This data is received by the Argos data collection relay system. The PTT transmitters require larger batteries, causing them to be heavier than VHF transmitters. Satellite tracking is more accurate at locating larger animals that are more exposed to the sky, such as birds or animals living in prairies, open deserts, or savannas.

== Applications ==
Wildlife radio telemetry has advanced the research opportunities available for studying animal populations. It can be applied to many areas of management and research to determine the habitat use of tagged animals, such as roost and foraging habitat preferences. Radio telemetry has been used to study the home range and movement of populations. Specific migratory routes and dispersal behavior can be followed through radio tracking. Survivorship is often monitored with radio telemetry by studying age and mortality rates. Technologies developed by companies such as Wildlife Drones have expanded these capabilities, enabling data collection using drone-based systems.

It is important that any negative effects of attaching radio-transmitters to animals are reported to improve methods and reduce harm to individuals in future studies.
