= Amelia Gray (polar bear) =

American polar bear

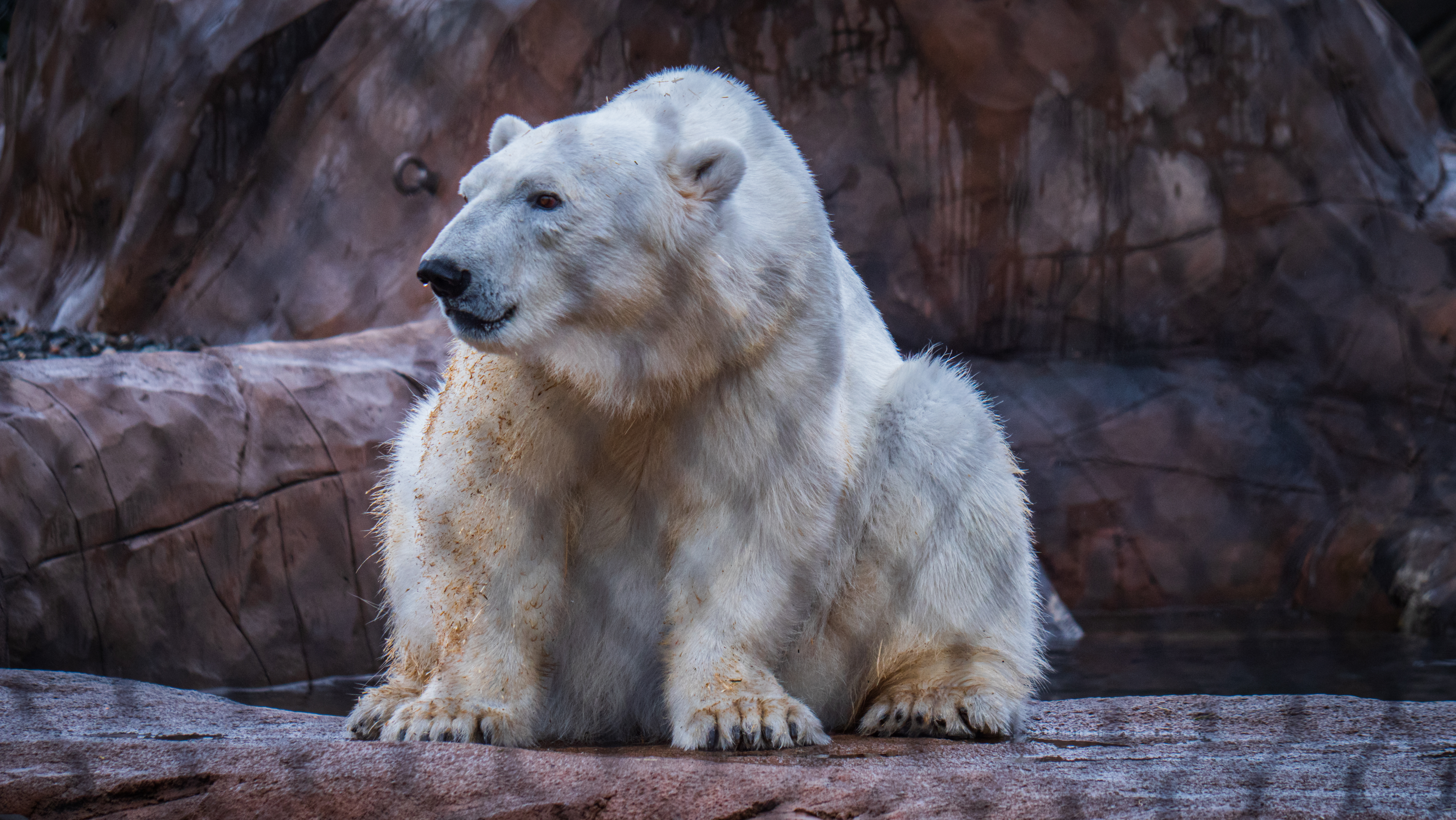
- Amelia Gray in 2022 at the Oregon Zoo
- Species: Polar bear
- Sex: Female
- Born: 2016; Columbus Zoo
- Residence: Brookfield Zoo
- Parent: Anana

Amelia Gray is a polar bear. She was born at the Columbus Zoo and Aquarium in 2016. She has also lived at The Maryland Zoo in Baltimore and, since 2021, the Oregon Zoo in Portland.

== Early life ==
Amelia Gray was born to Anana at the Columbus Zoo and Aquarium on November 8, 2016. She was one of three polar bear cubs in North American zoos in 2016. Amelia Gray received her name on Mother's Day in 2017. The name "Amelia" means "defender" and "gray" is a reference to a patch of fur on the left side of her neck.

== Residence ==
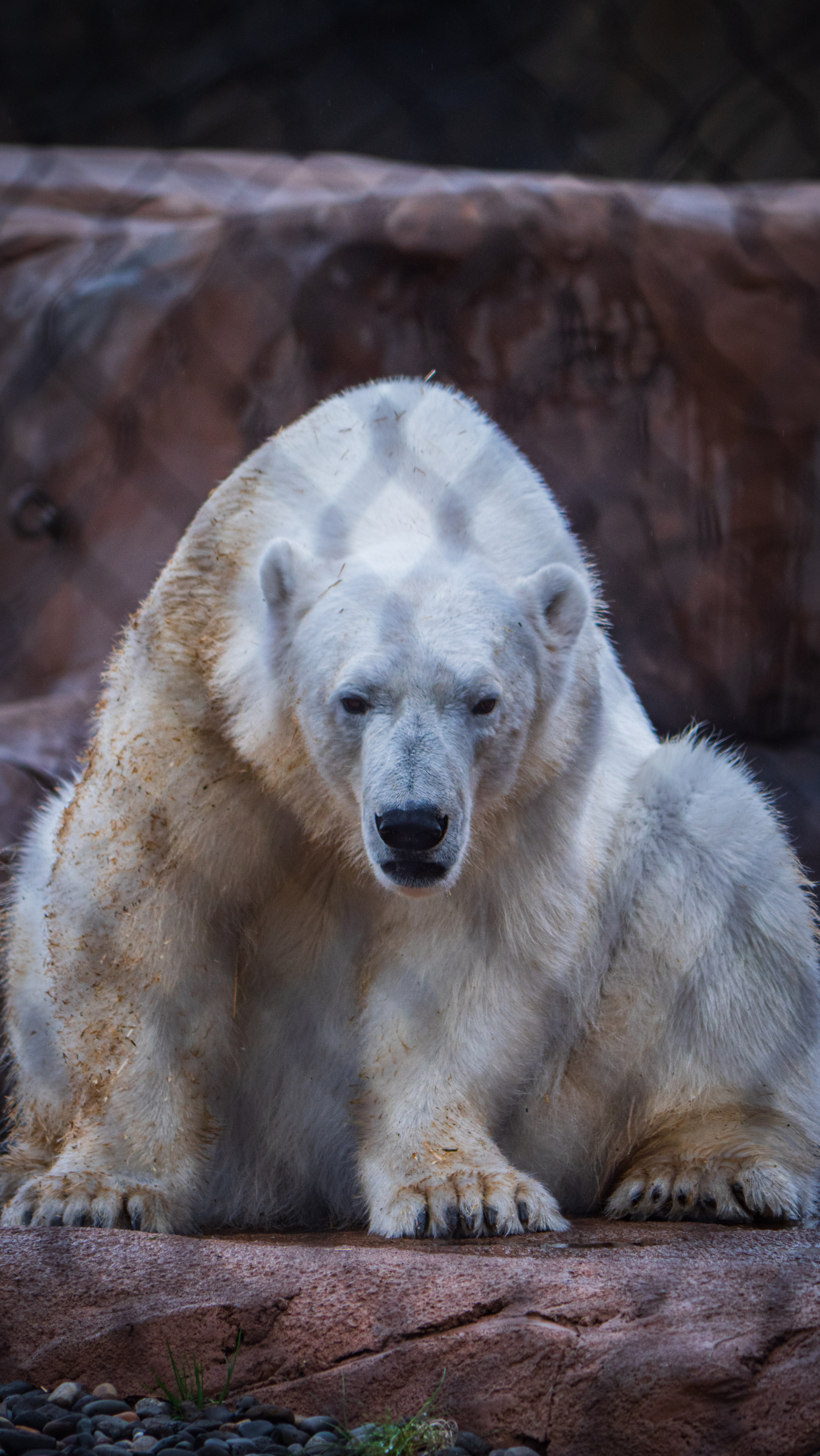
Amelia Gray, front profile, 2022

In 2018, plans were made to relocate Amelia Gray to The Maryland Zoo in Baltimore. She arrived in Baltimore in October, and she was initially quarantined.

In 2021, Amelia Gray was relocated to the Oregon Zoo, joining her half-sister Nora. Concerns were expressed about the two bears getting along, since they had not previously met. Amelia Gray arrived in October. She lived in the zoo's Polar Passage habitat and was given time to familiarize herself with her new surroundings before meeting Nora in November.

In 2022, the zoo tested "state-of-the-art laser technology" on Amelia Gray and Nora. According to KOIN, the bears "helped calibrate a special laser measuring body mass" and used a swim flume "to help scientists understand the calorie requirements of polar bears in the wild" for the purpose of providing "a safe, non-invasive way to monitor similar bears in the wild". In 2024, The Oregonian said both bears had received "celebrity status" in Portland and were "vital contributors to the zoo's conservation research".

In 2025, plans were made to move Amelia Gray to the Brookfield Zoo Chicago as part of a breeding effort. She is slated to join polar bears Hope and Hudson later in the year.

== Family ==
Anana, Amelia Gray's mother, swimming

Amelia Gray has half-sisters named Neva and Nora, who is a year older than her. Her mother is the polar bear Anana.

== Personality ==
Amelia Gray is the more reserved of her siblings, according to Mike McClure, general curator of the Maryland Zoo. McClure said that she is "cautious of her surroundings and needs more time to assess all of the input she receives from her environment." According to her zookeepers, she likes to have alone time.

== See also ==
- List of individual bears
