= List of wild animals from Los Angeles =

The following is a list of notable wild (captive and feral included) animals who were either born in, lived in, or are otherwise closely associated with the city or county of Los Angeles, California. Domesticated and working animals are not included.

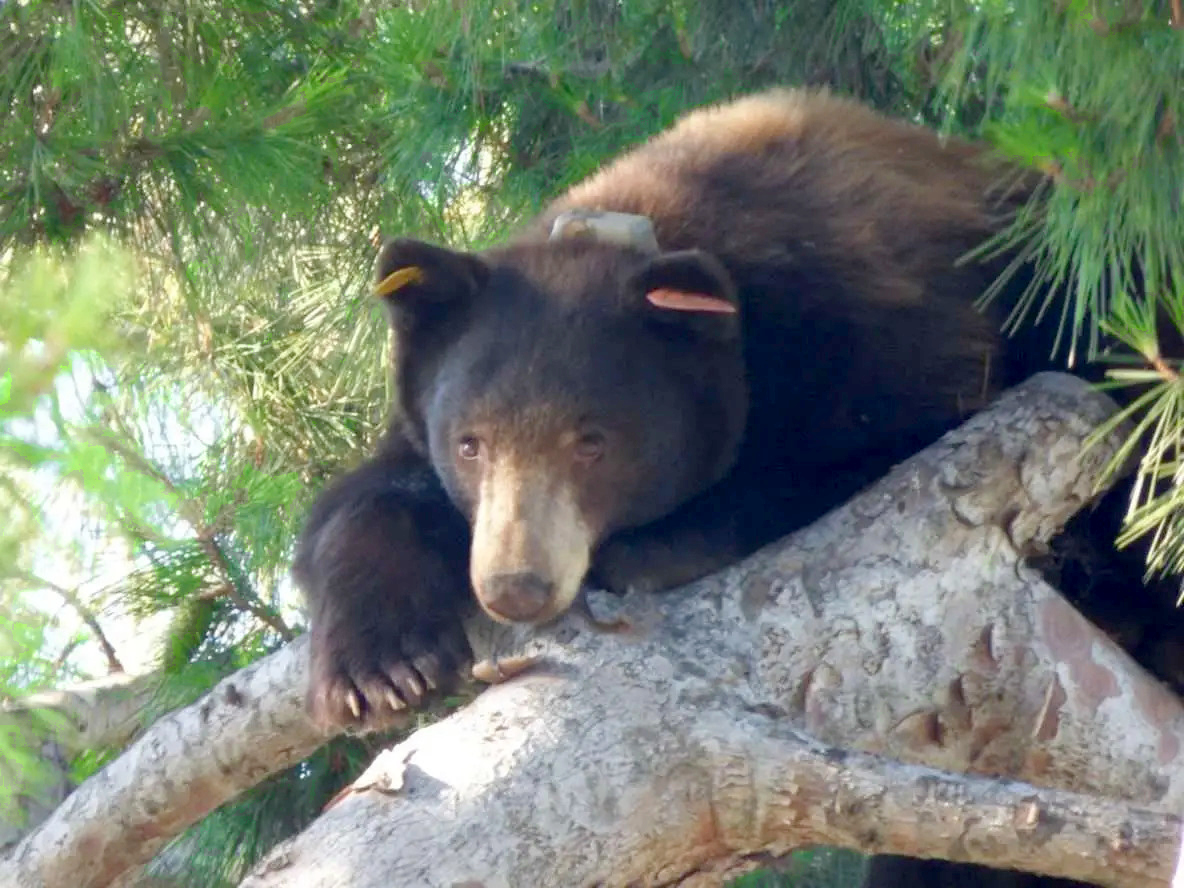
Yellow 2291

- Black bears
  - BB-12 – was tracked in the Santa Monica Mountains and killed while attempting to cross US-101
  - Maddie – repeatedly visited and swam in pools in Monrovia
  - Meatball – repeatedly visited neighborhoods in northern Los Angeles before being moved to an animal sanctuary in San Diego
  - Yellow 2291 – the first bear to raise a family in the Santa Monica Mountains in more than 25 years
- Evelyn – a gorilla who escaped her Los Angeles Zoo enclosure approximately five times in the late 1990s and early 2000s
- Gita – an Asian elephant whose death at the Los Angeles Zoo sparked public outcry
- Hollywood Freeway chickens – a feral chicken colony that lived under US-101's Vineland Avenue off-ramp
- Ivan the Terrible – a polar bear who killed three other polar bears during his time at the Griffith Park Zoo
- Mario – a Toulouse goose who formed a friendship with an Echo Park resident

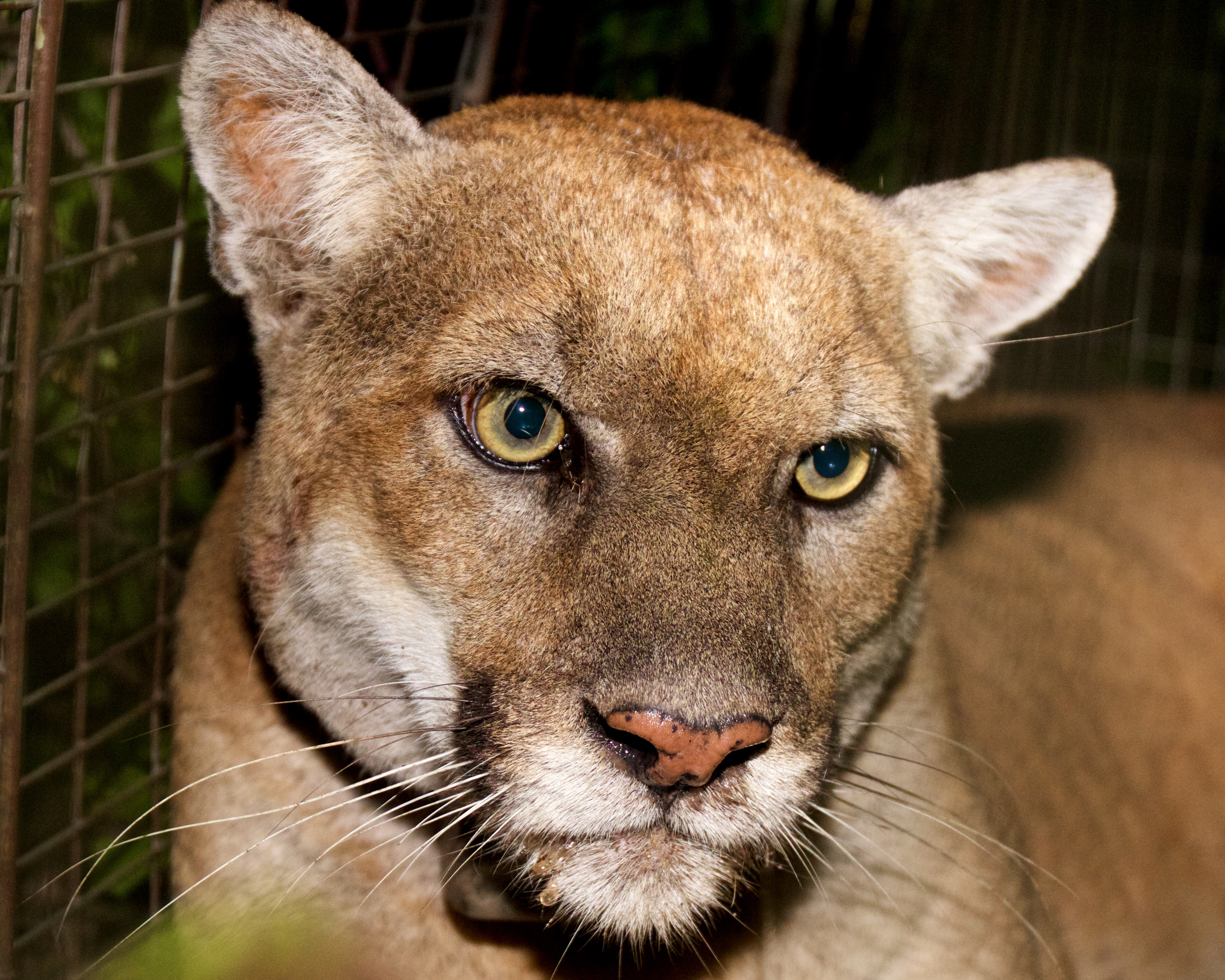
P-22

- Mountain lions in the Santa Monica Mountains – individual tracked mountain lions in the Santa Monica and surrounding mountains
  - P-1 – dominant male and first mountain lion tracked in the area
  - P-2 – first tracked female, mother, and intraspecific death in the area
  - P-22 – resided in Griffith Park and was featured on the cover of National Geographic
  - P-64 – nicknamed "Culvert Cat" after learning to use a culvert to cross under US-101
- Parrots of Pasadena – a population of non-indigenous feral parrots in Pasadena

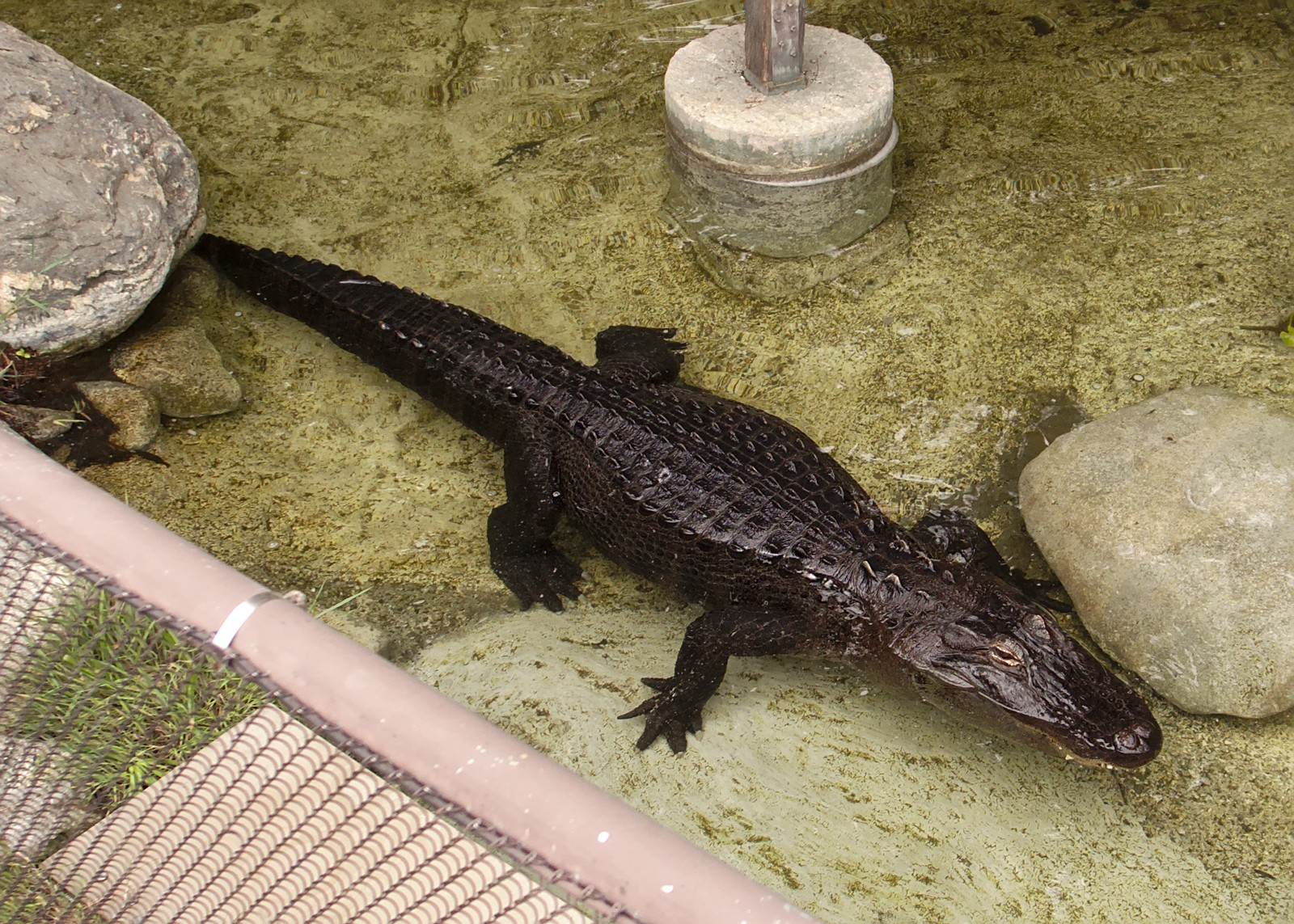
Reggie at the Los Angeles Zoo

- Reggie – an alligator who was raised in illegal captivity, then became feral, then was moved to the Los Angeles Zoo
- Room 8 – a housecat who from 1952 to the mid-1960s lived in Elysian Heights Elementary School during the school year and disappeared for the summer, returning when classes started again each year
- Wendy – a coyote with a deformed face, the result of a gunshot wound, that resided in Studio City

== See also ==
- Lists of individual animals
- Lists of Los Angeles topics
