= Hollywood Freeway chickens =

Colony of feral chickens in Los Angeles

Coordinates: 34.1469°N 118.3703°W

The Hollywood Freeway chickens were colonies of feral chickens that lived alongside the Hollywood Freeway in Los Angeles, California. The original colony was located across from the southern Vineland Avenue ramp of U.S. Route 101, while a second colony was reported near the Burbank Boulevard on-ramp of State Route 170 in 1990. The origins of the chickens remain uncertain, although news stories have frequently attributed the original colony to an overturned poultry truck.

The chickens became local celebrities following their appearance near the Vineland Avenue ramps around 1970. They inhabited roadside vegetation alongside the freeway. By 1976, the flock included about 50 chickens, described as Rhode Island Reds. They became known as "Minnie's chickens", named after Minnie Blumfield, an elderly retiree who fed them regularly. When she became too frail to feed them, a young actress, Jodie Mann, with Actors and Others for Animals, made arrangements to relocate the chickens. Nearly a hundred of the hens and roosters were relocated to a ranch in Simi Valley, California. However, reports of chickens in the area continued after the relocation efforts. In 1984, chickens were again reported near the original Vineland Avenue location.

A separate colony was reported in 1990 near the Burbank Boulevard on-ramp of State Route 170, approximately two miles north of the original Vineland Avenue location. A local resident suggested that the Burbank chickens had escaped from nearby after their owner acquired a pit bull, which frightened them away.

In November 2000, the Los Angeles Times reported that the San Fernando Valley Folklore Society considered the freeway chicken colonies to be still present. In 2004, Beverly Garland, actress and owner of an adjacent hotel, stated in an interview that the first colony had recently been fully relocated by the ASPCA. A later December 2009 retrospective in the Los Angeles Times reported that both the Vineland Avenue and Burbank Boulevard colonies had apparently disappeared, though there were still reports of chickens near the junction of Interstate 5 and State Route 14 in Newhall Pass.

The tale of the chicken colony and their spread inspired a short story by Terry Pratchett, "Hollywood Chickens".

== Origin ==
Beginning in the 1980s, twenty years after the colony's arrival, various individuals started coming forward claiming to know how the chickens got there. Among them:

- In 1990, Jeff Stein of Granada Hills, California claimed that in 1968, when his wife Janet and her twin sister were 12, they learned that a nearby school that raised animals was closing and that its resident chickens would be killed. The twins scooped them up and succeeded in hiding them at home until the roosters started waking up every morning at 5 a.m. The chickens couldn't stay, so the girls hiked through a field to an open area near the freeway and deposited two pillowcases full of them there.
- In 1992, a North Hollywood man who would give only his first name ("Michael") claimed that as a child he and his brother put their pet chickens under the freeway after neighbors repeatedly complained about them. "We were afraid to confess after (their numbers) got out of hand because we thought the city would bill us", he said.
- The widely believed, but never verified, explanation about an overturned poultry truck on the freeway resurfaced in 2000 when Joe Silbert of Laguna Hills, California claimed to be the driver of the legendary vehicle, saying, "I tried to avoid a lady who cut in front of me and I turned over. I was taking anywhere from 500 to 1,000 chickens back from the Valley to a slaughterhouse in L.A. They were all hens. We never picked up roosters. These were hens that had stopped laying. They would eat but not produce, so they were costing farmers money. Anyway, I had a crate of eggs on the seat beside me, and when I turned over, my head fell into the crate. But I wasn't hurt. I started chasing one chicken and it was on the TV news that night." A colony of hens without a rooster would not be able to reproduce, making this explanation rather dubious.

Nevertheless, there was at least one witness to the overturned poultry truck explanation. A driver on the way to work in Glendale was proceeding south on the 5 Freeway when she spotted three cars off to the side of the road that had been involved in a multiple rear-end collision. Blood and feathers were all over the freeway. On the overpass right above the accident site was a truck loaded with poultry cages, and each cage contained multiple chickens. Below, on the freeway, a smashed poultry cage was off to one side, and chickens could be seen walking around in the freeway median (which did not have walls at the time).

This peculiar chapter of Los Angeles history was going to be commemorated in 1984 with a large mural painted along the north wall of the Hollywood Freeway, but the mural was ultimately rejected for funding and not completed.

== See also ==
- List of individual birds
- List of wild animals from Los Angeles
- Giuliani (turkey)
- Zelda (turkey)
- Reggie (alligator)
