= BB-12 (black bear) =

Wild bear in Los Angeles (d. 2023)

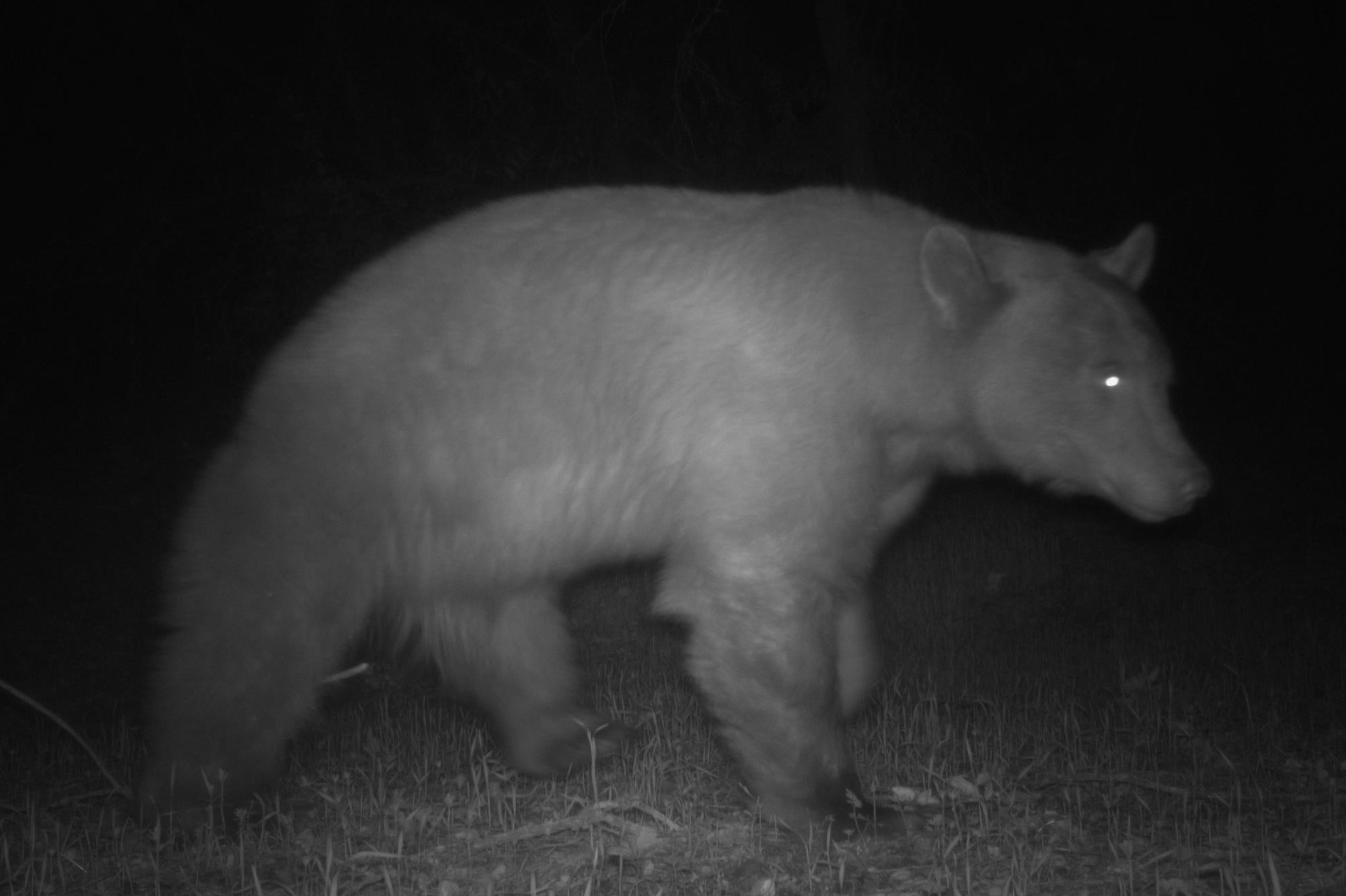
- BB-12 in 2023
- Other name: Black Bear 12
- Species: American black bear (Ursus americanus)
- Sex: Male
- Born: c. 2019
- Died: July 20, 2023 (aged 3–4); U.S. 101 in Ventura County
- Cause of death: Wildlife-vehicle collision
- Residence: Santa Monica and Santa Susana Mountains
- Weight: 210 lb (95 kg)

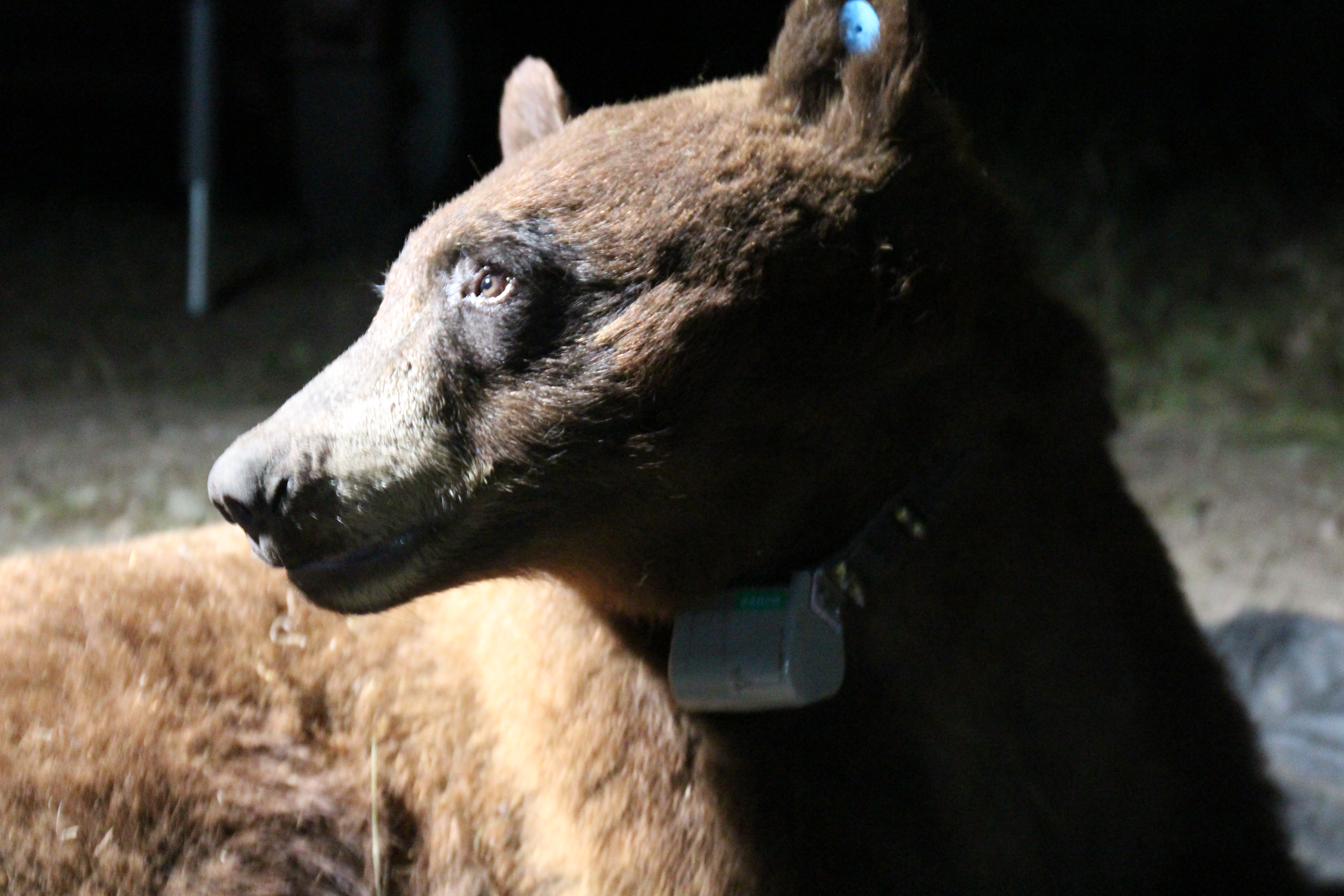
BB-12 with his tracking collar

BB-12 (c. 2019 – July 20, 2023) was a wild male American black bear who resided in the Santa Monica Mountains in Los Angeles and Ventura counties. He was the first of his kind to be GPS-tracked in the area.

== Life ==
Scientists believe BB-12 originated from the Santa Susana Mountains, where the nearest black bear population to him was located, and they also believe he was the first resident bear in the Santa Monica Mountains in more than twenty years.

BB-12 first came to the public's attention in 2021, when a Santa Monica Mountain resident posted a photograph of him on Reddit. For the next two years, BB-12 showed up on multiple cameras across the western half of the range, and in April 2023, the National Park Service captured and outfitted him with a GPS tracker. At the time, BB-12 weighed 210 pounds (95 kg) and was estimated to be 3-4 years old.

In the following three months, BB-12 was tracked living alone in the Santa Monica Mountains, Malibu, Thousand Oaks, Moorpark and several other locations. He made multiple trips to Malibu beaches and safely crossed major roads, including SR-118 and SR-23, five times. On BB-12's sixth attempt, crossing US-101 at the Conejo Grade between Newbury Park and Camarillo, he was struck by a vehicle and killed. The accident occurred on July 20, 2023 at around 9pm.

In the three months BB-12 was tracked, he roamed 138 square miles (360 km^{2}).

== Significance ==
BB-12 was the first bear tracked by the National Park Service in the Santa Monica Mountains and provided valuable information on connectivity in the region. At the time, the service had been tracking mountain lions in the area for more than 20 years.

The Wallis Annenberg Wildlife Crossing, meant to de-isolate the Santa Monica Mountains by connecting it over U.S. 101 to the Simi Hills, is currently being built near where BB-12 was killed. When completed, it will be the largest wildlife crossing in the world.

== See also ==
- List of individual bears
- List of wild animals from Los Angeles
- Fauna of the Santa Monica Mountains
- Yellow 2291
