= Wendy (coyote) =

Wild coyote in Los Angeles (died 2026)

- Other name: Sunshine
- Species: Coyote (Canis latrans)
- Sex: Female
- Born: c. 2023
- Died: September 8, 2026 (aged 3); Simi Valley, California, US
- Cause of death: Euthanasia following severe infection caused by a gunshot to the head
- Residence: Studio City, California, US

Wendy, also known as Sunshine, was a wild coyote who lived in Studio City, California, United States. She was known for her deformed face, caused by a gunshot wound, and was euthanized on September 8, 2026.

== History ==
Around 2023 or 2024, residents of the Los Angeles neighborhood of Studio City began to notice a wild coyote frequenting the area, and they first noticed swelling on her face in 2025. Rescuers originally thought her deformity might be a tumor, then the result of a wildlife–vehicle collision after a resident reported that the coyote had been involved in one around the time the deformity was first noticed. Rescuers also determined the coyote, by now named Wendy, was traversing an inconsistent 2.5-mile (4.0 km) route in the area while most likely being fed by locals.

On July 14, 2026, animal-care organization Wildlife Care of Southern California from Simi Valley, California, began tracking the coyote online; Urban Rescue and Southern California Pit Bull Rescue also assisted. The organizations began tracking the animal in person on August 7 and captured her on August 31. Wendy was estimated to be three years old when she was captured. An examination revealed two pellets lodged in her head, indicating that at some point she had been shot by a pellet gun; they also found that a severe infection had destroyed her upper left jaw bone. Rescuers fed her soft foods and treated her with antibiotics and anti-inflammatory medication, then euthanized her on September 8, 2026, after determining that no treatment or surgery could restore her normal function. The organization explained that she would require a soft food diet for the rest of her life, meaning she could not return to the wild nor would she experience freedom in a captive environment, and that "keeping her alive under those circumstances would not be humane."

The day after her death, Southern California Pit Bull Rescue announced a $10,000 reward for information leading to the arrest and conviction of her shooter. On September 16, the reward was increased to $21,000.

== See also ==
- List of individual animals
- List of wild animals from Los Angeles
