= Williams' Book Store =

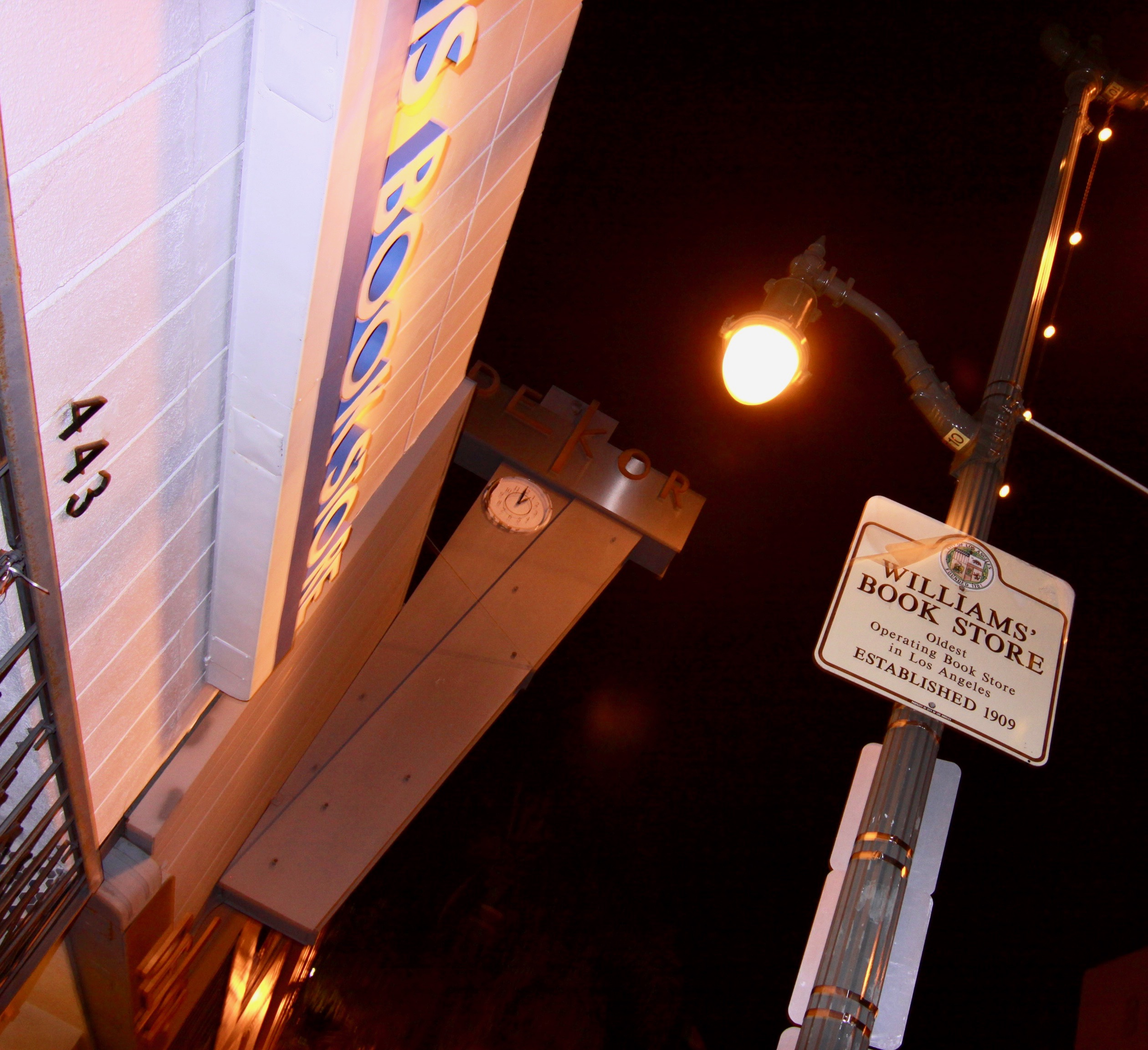
- Industry: Book seller
- Founded: 1909
- Founder: Edward Thorpe "E.T." Williams
- Headquarters: 443 W. 6th St., San Pedro, California, U.S.

Williams' Book Store was a historic book shop founded in 1909 in San Pedro, California. It was open for 104 years before folding due to the competition of the online book market.

== History ==
Williams' was founded by Edward Thorpe "E.T." Williams, an immigrant from Wales who had previously owned a book store in Wales and, subsequently, London.

When Williams died in 1940, his eldest daughter, Ethel Williams-Smith, took over the business. Anne Gusha, who had known the store since childhood and began working there in the early 1940s, later became part of its management, and in 1980 she and her son Jerry Gusha acquired the business from Williams-Smith. Under the Gushas, Williams' remained a general independent bookstore serving downtown San Pedro and the surrounding community.

By the time of its centennial in 2009, Williams' Book Store was widely described as the oldest continuously operating bookstore in the city of Los Angeles. It continued in business until 2013, completing 104 years of continuous operation in San Pedro.

Patrons included Charles Bukowski — a regular, according to Gusha — and actor Charles Laughton.

== 100th anniversary celebration ==
The store celebrated its 100th anniversary in 2009 with the appearance of various authors including Ray Bradbury, Angi Ma Wong, and Lisa See.
