= Topsy the Camel =

Female Bactrian camel (died 1934)

Topsy
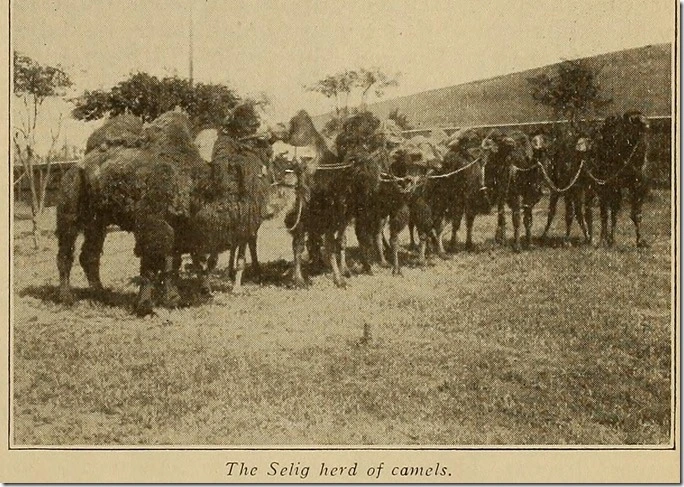
- Selig Zoo camels, most likely featuring Topsy
- Other name: Old Topsy
- Species: Bactrian camel (Camelus bactrianus)
- Sex: Female
- Born: prior to 1855, possibly as early as c. 1834 most likely Tunisia, Malta, Greece, Turkey, or Egypt
- Died: April 1934; Griffith Park Zoo, Los Angeles, California
- Cause of death: Euthanized after paralysis

Topsy the Camel (born prior to 1855, possibly as early as c. 1834 – April 1934), also known as Old Topsy, was a female Bactrian camel who was the last surviving member of the United States Camel Corps. Later in life, she was part of a menagerie at Ringling Brothers Circus, then was featured in several early films, then was a resident at the Selig and Griffith Park zoos.

== Life ==
Topsy was one of thirty-three adult camels purchased by the United States from Tunisia, Malta, Greece, Turkey, and Egypt between August 1855 and February 1856. The cost for each camel was approximately $250 ($8,638 in 2025).

Topsy and the other camels arrived in Indianola, Texas, in May 1856 and shortly after were moved to San Antonio and then Camp Verde, where the United States Camel Corps was created. The project was never officially designated the "Camel Corps", although it later became widely known by that name. Many of these camels, including possibly Topsy, were moved by the US Army to Fort Tejon, California in 1859 and all Army camels were decommissioned in 1864 and sold for roughly $50 ($1,029 in 2025) each.

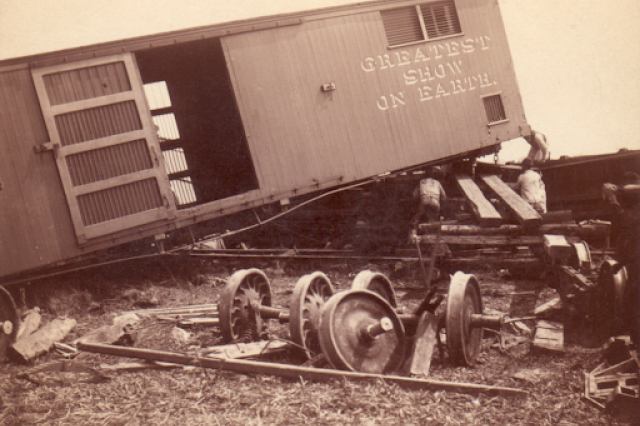
Ringling Brothers train crash that injured Topsy, 1899

After being sold by the US Army, Topsy worked hauling salt and ore from Arizona and Nevada mines until the end of the US Civil War. She was then purchased by Ringling Brothers, where she traveled the US as part of their circus outfits. While traveling, Topsy and her mate were hit by a train, with Topsy sustaining broken humps and spine injuries that she recovered from. Topsy's mate did not survive the collision.

By the early 1900s, camels had become popular in film, as they were used to portray exotic locations. Topsy was obtained by Fox Studios during this time, who then donated her to William Selig's Selig Polyscope Company in Los Angeles in 1909.

In 1915, William Selig opened Selig Zoo in East Los Angeles, which housed more than 700 animals, including Topsy. The zoo, however, was not profitable, forcing Selig to sell it in 1918. It permanently closed at the beginning of the Great Depression, with Topsy donated to the Griffith Park Zoo in the 1920s.

Topsy spent the rest of her life at Griffith Park Zoo, where she was well known due to her misshapen humps. She was eventually euthanized after suffering crippling paralysis, with her obituary published in the Madera Tribune on April 27, 1934. Griffith Park Zoo cited her as 100 years old at the time of her death, while the US Army puts her at 80 years old at her death. She was the last surviving camel from the United States Camel Corps.

== See also ==
- List of individual animals
