= Maddie (bear) =

Wild animal in Monrovia, California

Maddie, or Maddie Bear, is a wild female American black bear living in Monrovia, California. She went viral for swimming with her cubs in the pool of Brian Gordon and Ricardo Martinez. Her story is similar to "Samson the Hot Tub Bear" who lived in Monrovia during the late 20th century.

== Description ==
Although various adult bear sightings are made frequently in Monrovia, Maddie was reportedly named by local residents after viral appearances in hot tubs and backyards. In May 2024, homeowners Brian Gordon and Ricardo "Ricky" Martinez documented Maddie and her two cubs swimming in their pool, which is along the edge of the Angeles National Forest. Initially afraid of bears, the couple developed a fondness for Maddie and her cubs. With sightings beginning shortly after the couple bought the home in November 2022, Gordon said that the bears would visit their pool "three to five times" per week.

Punky Bear is another of the bears associated with Maddie to frequent the home of Gordon and Martinez. Two of Maddie's cubs stopped coming to the house with her and are believed to have not survived to adulthood. Another bear in the area, Blondie, was euthanized by the California Department of Fish and Wildlife after swiping at a woman walking her dog in the neighborhood, despite requests by the Monrovia City Council for relocation to the Angeles National Forest instead. A community vigil was organized to honor Blondie, who was another visitor to the home of Gordon and Martinez; Gordon had organized a petition with more than 3,700 signatories opposing euthanasia for Blondie.

== In popular culture ==
The story of Maddie and her cubs at the home of Gordon and Martinez was a central component of the documentary Wildlife on the Edge II: Bears. The 2025 documentary, created for the environmentalist streaming service Ecoflix, screened at the Newport Beach Film Festival.

The 2026 documentary short Bears in Hot Tubs, created with the support of the Puffin Foundation, also tells Maddie's story. Maddie Bear herself is credited as a co-director of the film, alongside Claire Musser, who is the director of the Grand Canyon Wolf Recovery Project.

== See also ==
- List of individual bears
- List of wild animals from Los Angeles
