= Angi Ma Wong =

American publisher, teacher, counselor and author (1947-2015)

- Born: February 7, 1947; Nanjing, China
- Died: July 12, 2015 (aged 68)
- Occupation: Author, educator, businessperson, humanitarian
- Known for: Popularization of the feng shui discipline

Angi Ma Wong (February 7, 1947 – July 12, 2015) was an American businesswoman, publisher, teacher, counselor, and author of 27 books. She was also co-founder of the Chinese Historical Society of Southern California and served time as its president. She was regarded as an expert in feng shui. Her historical fiction children's book Night of the Red Moon was nominated for a John and Patricia Beatty Award.

== Early life ==
Ma Wong was born in Nanjing, China and baptized as an Anglican. Her family then moved to Hong Kong. When Ma Wong was two years old, the family moved again, this time to New Zealand. There, Ma Wong grew up in Wellington. Her family then moved to Taipei. Following that, they ended up in Richfield, New Jersey, by which time Ma Wong was in 8th grade. She was the first and only Asian student there. A year later, the family moved to Washington, D.C., where her father, a diplomat, had been transferred. Subsequently, Ma Wong went off to college in Blacksburg, Virginia, where she attended Virginia Tech. After college, Ma Wong married and moved to Los Angeles with her husband. In 1989, at age 26, she experienced breast cancer—the first of several times she would have it. The illness inspired her to fulfill two dreams she had at the time, one being to write a book, and the other, to own her own business.

== Education and marriage ==
Ma Wong attended Virginia Tech. While at Virginia Tech she founded the service sorority Chi Delta Alpha (XDA). She then graduated from USC with BA in English. She then earned her teaching credential from California State University, Long Beach. Ma Wong and her husband, Norman, had four children.

== Career ==
Ma Wong founded a feng shui consulting and corporate training service in 1989, a notable early date for the popularization of the discipline in the United States, as it had only taken hold in the U.S. in 1972, after President Richard Nixon visited China. She subsequently founded Pacific Heritage Books in 1992. She co-founded the Chinese Historical Society of Southern California and served as its president, also becoming active in Rotary Club activities that earned her a place in their Hall of Fame for the years 2014–2015. Ma Wong served the Los Angeles Unified School District in a variety of capacities, including teacher and counselor, for 33 years. Ma Wong also served on the board of directors at Los Angeles's historic Banning Museum, designed and used by Civil War general Phineas Banning.

== Awards and recognition ==
- National Association of Women Business Owners Outstanding L.A. Businesswoman of the Year (1995)
- Southern California Book Publicist of the Year (1997)
- Rotary District 5280 Hall of Fame inductee (2015)
- INK Magazine Entrepreneur of the Year Award

== Bibliography ==
- Target: The U.S.-Asian Market: A Practical Guide to Doing Business (1993)
- Night of the Red Moon (1995)
- The Wind-Water Wheel : A Feng Shui Tool for Transforming Your Life (1996)
- Been There, Done That: 16 Secrets of Success for Entrepreneurs (1997)
- The Baby Boomer's 4-Minute Bible: Enduring Values to Live By (1998)
- Feng Shui Dos and Taboos: : A Guide to What to Place Where (1999)
- Feng Shui Dos & Taboos for Love (2002)
- Who Ate My Socks? (2005)
- Reggie, the L.A. Gator (2006)
- A Survivor's Secrets to Health & Happiness (2010)

== Television and web ==
Title	Year	Role
Oprah Winfrey Show		Herself
CBS Sunday Morning		Herself
CNN		Herself
The Learning Channel		Herself
It's Rainmaking Time!	2010	Herself
