= List of individual bears =

The following is a list of individual bears (other than individual giant pandas) which garnered national or worldwide attention. For a list of fictional bears, see List of fictional bears.

== Actors ==
- Bart the Bear, a male Alaskan Kodiak bear, played the leading role in the 1988 wilderness drama, The Bear. Between 1980 and his death in 2000, he also appeared in many other films, including White Fang, Legends of the Fall, and The Edge, and was called "the John Wayne of Bears".
- Bart the Bear 2 (named after the original Bart the Bear, also called "Little Bart"), a male interior Alaskan brown bear, has appeared in several films including An Unfinished Life, Into the Wild, and We Bought a Zoo, and TV shows including CSI, Scrubs, and Game of Thrones. He and his sister Honey Bump were also featured in the TV documentaries Growing Up Grizzly and Growing Up Grizzly 2 on the Animal Planet network.
- Bonkers, a 650-pound male American black bear, has been in films like The Jungle Book: Mowgli's Story and as the title character, "Gentle Ben", in the remake, Gentle Ben (2002), and Gentle Ben 2. Bonkers starred in a 2004 movie called A Bear Named Winnie as the adult Winnie, starring Michael Fassbender as Colebourn. He was in a commercial for the Black Bear Casino Resort.
- Bozo, a female Kodiak bear, had a co-starring role in the NBC TV series The Life and Times of Grizzly Adams from 1977 to 1978. She played "Benjamin Franklin" aka "Ben", the constant companion of "Grizzly Adams" (played by Dan Haggerty). She also appeared in the films The Night of the Grizzly (1966) and King of the Grizzlies (1970).
- Brody, a male Kodiak bear, has appeared in numerous films, television shows, commercials, and print ads. He has worked with wildlife photographers and appeared on the cover of National Geographic Magazine. Brody and his owner, Jeff Watson, have appeared throughout the United States for educational programs focusing on bears and safety.
- Bruno, a male American black bear, appeared as the primary bear actor in the lead role of "Ben" in the 1967 feature film Gentle Giant and the subsequent U.S. television series Gentle Ben from 1967 to 1969. In 1968 he won two PATSY Awards for his work on the film and series. He later received positive reviews for his performance as "Watch Bear" opposite Paul Newman in the 1972 film The Life and Times of Judge Roy Bean.
- Hercules, a male grizzly bear born in captivity in Scotland and originally trained as a wrestling bear, became a regular star of British children's television and appeared in the James Bond film Octopussy. He made news in 1980 when he escaped from his trainer and owner, Andy Robin, while filming a Kleenex commercial in Scotland.
- Brutus, a male grizzly bear who is the companion of naturalist and television presenter Casey Anderson, appeared with Anderson in the syndicated Nat Geo documentary television series Expedition Wild. Brutus has had small roles in two feature films, Iron Ridge (2008) and Pretty Ugly People (2008), as well as appearing in numerous educational bear videos.
- Rocky, a male grizzly bear trained by Randy Miller, appeared in the 2008 film Semi-Pro as "Dewey the Killer Bear", in which he wrestled Will Ferrell's body double. On April 22, 2008, Rocky killed trainer Stephan Miller while the two were filming a bear wrestling stunt for a promotional video. The death was later ruled accidental and Rocky was allowed to continue to live under restrictions.
- Teddy, a male Kodiak bear, starred in the 1976 film Grizzly where he portrayed a killer grizzly bear.
- Whopper, a male Kodiak bear, has appeared in films including Anchorman: The Legend of Ron Burgundy, Grizzly Falls, Air Bud: Golden Receiver, Escape to Grizzly Mountain and The Last Trapper. He is known for his scary bear act where he stands on his hind legs and does a simulated roar.

== Wrestlers and performers ==
- Hercules, a male grizzly bear owned and trained by Scottish wrestler Andy Robin, appeared on the UK wrestling circuit before becoming known as an actor.
- Sackerson, the most famous bear used in the beargardens of Elizabethan England. It is rumoured, though unlikely, that Sackerson or a bear of his ilk played the part of the bear in A Winter's Tale.
- Terrible Ted, a male American black bear from Canada trained by Canadian wrestler Dave McKigney, wrestled regularly for various North American promotions from the 1950s until the 1970s.
- Victor the Wrestling Bear, a male American black bear (reported by some sources as an Alaskan brown bear) from Canada trained by American wrestler Tuffy Truesdell, wrestled for various North American promotions and also as an attraction at ABA games, sports shows and fairs, starting in the late 1950s. Victor also made several TV appearances including The Ed Sullivan Show and The Tonight Show Starring Johnny Carson, and was in the 1969 film Paint Your Wagon with Clint Eastwood and Lee Marvin. The original Victor died in the mid-1970s from a heart attack and Truesdell, who owned and trained a number of bears, transferred the name to another bear and continued the act until the mid-1980s. Truesdell may also have had several bears working under the "Victor" name.

== Mascots ==
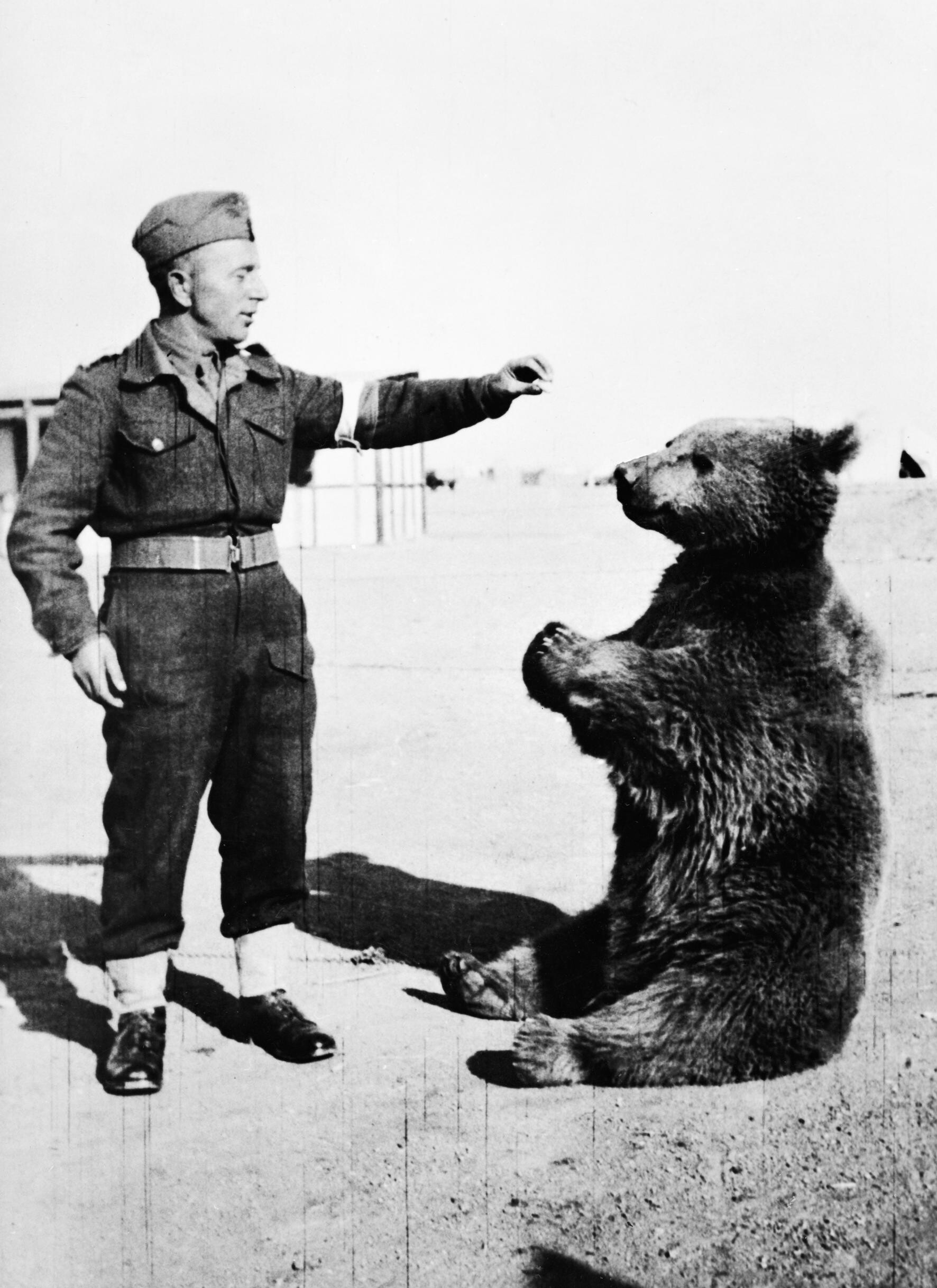
Wojtek (right) with a Polish soldier

- Bruno II was a male Brown Bear who served as a live mascot for Brown University from 1921 to 1928. Bruno II was one in a series of live bear mascots from Helen in 1903 through the 1960s. Later, he had a brief theatrical career in a play, where they rewrote the part to allow a bear to appear instead of a lamb.
- Hotfoot, later renamed Smokey, a male American black bear cub, was discovered in the 1950 Capitan Gap forest fire in New Mexico, and became the original incarnation of the 1944 Smokey Bear advertising poster created by the Advertising Council's Rudy Wendelin.
- Joa, possibly named after the initials of American meat packing magnate J. Ogden Armour, was the best known real bear mascot of the Chicago Cubs. Joa was first displayed by the team on June 20, 1916 and served as a successor to previous mascots until its sale to the Lincoln Park Zoo.
- Juno, a captive polar bear at the Toronto Zoo, was made the mascot of the Canadian Army and given the rank of Honorary Master Corporal.
- Rocky (originally named Rakkasan), a female Asian black bear, was purchased as a cub for 40,000 yen (approximately $111) by members of the 187th Airborne Regimental Combat Team (United States) from a zoo in Kumamoto, Japan, where they were stationed during the Korean War. She made five parachute jumps, which allowed her to qualify as a paratrooper, and received a Purple Heart after being injured by shell fragments under enemy artillery fire. In 1954, at the age of 16 months, she was sent to live at the Lincoln Park Zoo in Chicago.
- Touchdown was the unofficial mascot of Cornell University. The Cornell University Athletic Association acquired this black bear cub in the fall of 1915. Touchdown appeared at all of the games played by the Cornell football team that year. At the games, Touchdown was tethered to a stepladder so that he could climb on the home sideline of the field. He also climbed a goal post before each game, which quickly became a tradition for the fans. This year also marked the first year Cornell football went undefeated, which led to fans believing that Touchdown was a good omen.
- Wojtek, a male Syrian brown bear, was adopted by a Polish army unit stationed in Iran during World War II. In order for Wojtek to accompany the unit when they sailed from Egypt to Italy, he was drafted into the Polish army as a Private. He took part in the Battle of Monte Cassino in 1944 by carrying artillery ammunition. After the war he lived in Edinburgh Zoo, Scotland. See List of monuments and memorials to Wojtek.
- Winnipeg, a female American black bear, was purchased as a cub at a train stop in Ontario, Canada, by a member of the Canadian Army Veterinary Corps (CAVC), who named her after his hometown of Winnipeg, Manitoba. She became the CAVC mascot and accompanied the unit to England. When the unit transferred to France for combat, she was given to the London Zoo, where she lived from 1915 to 1934. Winnipeg is best known today as the inspiration for the name of the character Winnie-the-Pooh in A. A. Milne's classic children's books.

== Companion bears ==
- Benjamin Franklin aka "Ben", a male grizzly bear, was a companion of American mountain man James "Grizzly" Adams and named after American statesman and founding father Benjamin Franklin.
- Brutus, a male grizzly bear, was the "best friend" of naturalist Casey Anderson and lived with other bears at the Montana Grizzly Encounter bear sanctuary founded by Anderson. Brutus sometimes ate dinner at the table with Anderson's family and was best man at Anderson's wedding.

== Wild bears ==
- BB-12, a male American black bear who lived in the Santa Monica Mountains, was GPS-tracked by the National Park Service, and was killed in a wildlife-vehicle collision in 2023
- Bear 71, a female grizzly bear who lived in Banff National Park, was collared at the age of three and was watched her whole life via trail cameras in the park. She is the subject of a 2011 National Film Board of Canada web documentary Bear 71, which premiered at the 2012 Sundance Film Festival.
- Bear 122 (also called The Boss) is a male grizzly bear residing in Banff National Park. Estimated to weigh between 600 and 700 pounds, Bear 122 has been the most dominant bear in the park for many years. 122 has survived being hit by a train, he has killed and eaten black bears, and he is known to have fathered numerous cubs in the region.
- Bear 141, a large male coastal brown bear that resided in Katmai National Park that killed and partially devoured naturalist and bear-enthusiast Timothy Treadwell and his girlfriend Amie Huguenard in 2003. Bear 141 was shot and killed by park rangers on October 6, 2003, to allow retrieval of the bodies. The events leading up to the deaths are documented in the film Grizzly Man.
- Bear 480 (also called Otis) was a male brown bear that lived in Alaska's Katmai National Park. Bear 480 was recognized in 2014, 2016, 2017, and 2021 as part of a campaign on the park's social media accounts as the park's fattest bear. Through the use of Lidar scanning technology, 480 Otis was estimated to weigh over 900 pounds in autumn.
- Bear 856, a very large male brown bear residing in Alaska's Katmai National Park. For over a decade, 856 has been the most dominant bear to use Brooks Falls. Park staff consider the behavior of 856 to be "hyper dominant" - he displays an unusually high level of aggression toward other bears and will often go out of his way to challenge or chase away other large dominant males. Through the use of Lidar scanning, 856 is estimated to weigh over 1,200 pounds. 856 is approximately 5 feet tall at the shoulder and over 9 feet tall when standing upright on his hind legs.
- Bear JJ1 (also called "Bruno", "Beppo", or "Petzi"), a male Eurasian brown bear seen during the first half of 2006, was the first brown bear spotted in Southern Germany for a century. He was controversially shot in June 2006 after killing domestic animals.
- Cinder, a young female black bear rescued and rehabilitated after her paws were badly burned in a fire. She was released after she recovered, and was shot by a hunter around October 2017.
- Cocaine Bear was an 175-lb female eastern black bear who was notable for being found having ingested 77 lb (35 kg) of cocaine worth US$14 million in Georgia's Chattahoochee–Oconee National Forest. Her body is on display in Kentucky.
- Grizzly 399, a female grizzly bear who lived in Grand Teton National Park and the Bridger–Teton National Forest in Jackson, Wyoming. She was made famous by wildlife photographers and tourists around 2005, with millions coming to the parks each summer to see her and her cubs. She was struck and killed by a vehicle on Highway 26/89 in Snake River Canyon on the evening of October 22, 2024.
- Hank the Tank, a Lake Tahoe female black bear accused of breaking into thirty human residences in search of food; later exonerated on DNA evidence. She was captured in August 2023 after a year on the run.
- Hope, a female American black bear cub famous for being "born on the internet" in 2010 when her birth was broadcast by webcam, her and her mother Lily were subjects of a study by Professor Lynn Rogers and were featured in the BBC documentary The Bear Family & Me. In September 2011, it was reported that Hope was believed to have been shot dead by hunters.
- Kesagake was an Ussuri brown bear who in December 1915 killed seven people in Sankebetsu, in the worst bear attack in Japanese history.
- MacFarlane's Bear, an abnormal-looking grizzly bear killed by Inuit hunters in 1864 and initially believed to represent a new species. Later examination determined it to be a grizzly bear.
- Maddie, an American black bear that went viral for swimming with her cubs at a pool in Monrovia, California
- Meatball, an American black bear that repeatedly visited neighborhoods in northern Los Angeles before being moved to an animal sanctuary in San Diego
- Old Ephraim (also called "Old Three Toes" due to a deformed foot), a male grizzly bear, was a very large bear who roamed the Cache National Forest c. 1911–1923.
- Pedals was an American black bear who walked upright on his hind legs due to injuries on his front paws. He was filmed many times walking around suburban neighborhoods in New Jersey, and became well known as the videos were published on the internet.
- The sloth bear of Mysore was an unusually aggressive Indian sloth bear who killed a minimum of twelve people during the mid-20th century before being killed by Kenneth Anderson.
- Yellow 2291, a female American black bear who was the first to raise a family in the Santa Monica Mountains in more than 25 years
- Yellow-Yellow, a black bear in the Adirondack Mountains of upstate New York, was known for her ability to open several models of bear-resistant food storage containers.
- An (unnamed) old injured bear was tied up in Mississippi as part of a canned hunt for President Theodore Roosevelt. Teddy Roosevelt refused to shoot the bear, and this event was popularized by cartoonist Clifford Berryman, resulting in the creation of the Teddy bear.
- OSO18, a gigantic bear that made news in Japan for attacking a large number of cattle in Nemuro and Akkeshi in eastern Hokkaido in the summer of 2023. On August 22, 2023, the Hokkaido Prefectural Government's brown bear task force announced that OSO18 had likely been killed in late July.
- Tripod, a three-legged black bear in Lake Mary, Florida, who gained viral fame in September 2023 for breaking into a home's outdoor refrigerator to drink White Claw hard seltzers. Estimated to be 6–10 years old and weighing roughly 275–300 pounds, this localized celebrity is monitored by the Florida Fish and Wildlife Conservation Commission (FWC).

== Zoological specimens ==
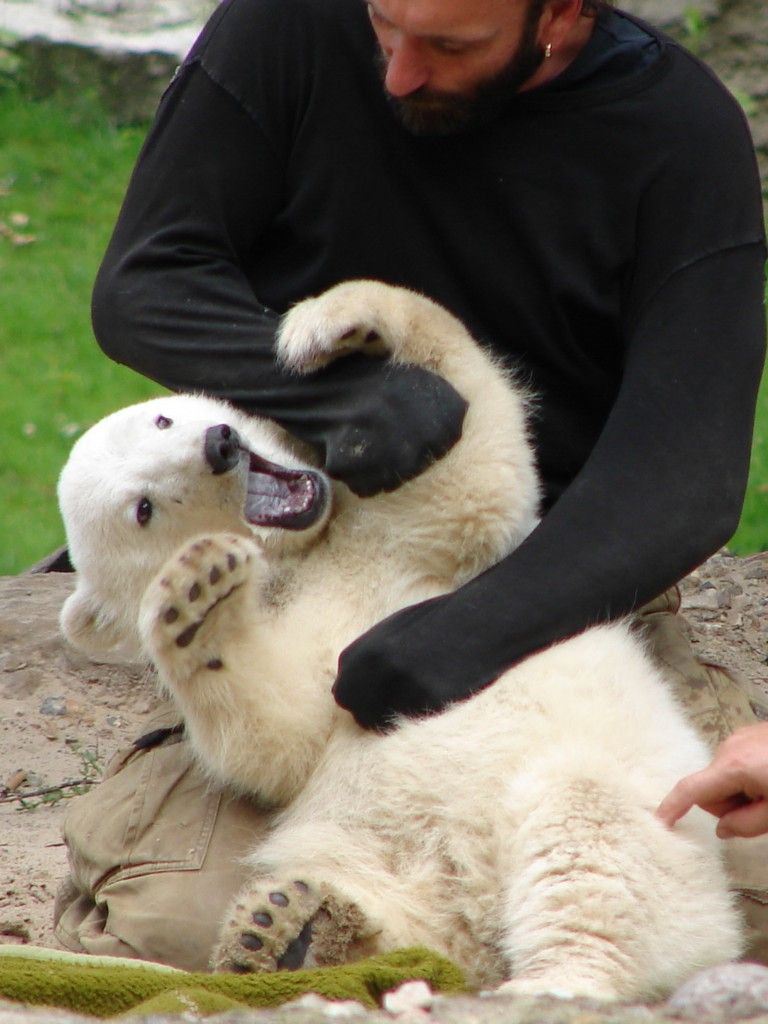
Knut, the famous polar bear cub from the Berlin Zoological Garden, in May 2007

- Arturo, a male polar bear at Mendoza Zoological Park in Argentina. There was a widespread campaign for him to be transferred to Canada due to concern over his living conditions at the park.
- Binky, a male polar bear at the Alaska Zoo in Anchorage, Alaska, became famous in the summer of 1994 after mauling several zoo visitors who, disregarding safety bars and signs, got too close to the bear's enclosure.
- Brumas, a female polar bear (born November 1949), was the first baby polar bear to be successfully reared in the United Kingdom. Raised at Regent's Park Zoo in London, she became a major celebrity and was largely responsible for zoo attendance records. Although a female, it was erroneously reported in the press that Brumas was male, and as such many members of the public believed her to be a "he". Brumas died in May 1958.
- Danny, a male Syrian brown bear who lived at the Qalqilya National Zoo in Qalqilya, West Bank, Palestine, from 1995 until he died at the age of 31 in July 2026.
- Debby, a female polar bear at the Assiniboine Park Zoo in Winnipeg. She is the world's oldest known polar bear, dying at age 41.
- Flocke, a female polar bear, was born in captivity at the Nuremberg Zoo in Nuremberg, Germany, on 11 December 2007. After concerns over the cub's safety were raised due to her aggressive mother, Flocke was removed from the other bears in the zoo and raised by hand. She became a popular tourist attraction at the zoo; her trademarked name and image were used in a publicity campaign for the metropolitan region of Nuremberg.
- Gus, a male polar bear at the Central Park Zoo in New York City from 1988 to 2013, came to media attention in the 1990s when he was seen obsessively swimming in his pool for up to 12 hours a day. The zoo paid an animal behavioral therapist to diagnose Gus' problem; the therapist concluded that Gus was "bored and mildly crazy in the way that a lot of people are in New York". Gus' erratic behavior tapered off with changes to his habitat and mealtimes; he was also the first zoo animal in history to be treated with Prozac. From the publicity surrounding his diagnosis and treatment, Gus became a symbol of the "neurotic" New Yorker and was the subject of several books and a play.
- Inuka (Inuit for "Silent Stalker"), a male polar bear, was born in 1990, and one of the mascots of the Singapore Zoo. Inuka was euthanised on 18 April 2018.
- Ivan the Terrible, a male polar bear who killed three other polar bears at the Griffith Park Zoo.
- Jeremy, a female brown bear at the Camperdown Wildlife Centre in Dundee who notably bit a boy in 1986.
- Knut, a male polar bear born in captivity at the Berlin Zoological Garden, was rejected by his mother at birth and raised by zookeepers. He was the first polar bear cub to survive past infancy at the Berlin Zoo in more than 30 years. At one time the subject of international controversy, he became a tourist attraction and commercial success. Knut became the center of a mass media phenomenon dubbed "Knutmania" that spanned the globe and spawned toys, media specials, DVDs, and books. Because of this, the cub was largely responsible for a significant increase in revenue, estimated at about five million euros, at the Berlin Zoo in 2007. On 19 March 2011, Knut unexpectedly died at the age of four. His death was caused by drowning after he collapsed into his enclosure's pool while suffering from encephalitis.
- Monarch, a male California grizzly bear, was one of the last wild grizzly bears in California, United States. Monarch was captured in 1889 upon orders of newspaper editor William Randolph Hearst and was put on public display by Hearst at Woodward's Gardens in San Francisco. At the time he was thought to be the largest bear in captivity, and over 20,000 people came to see him on the first day of the exhibit. After his death, his stuffed body was used as the model for the bear on the California state flag.
- Nora, a female polar bear at the Oregon Zoo.
- Old Martin was a large grizzly bear given to George III in 1811 by the Hudson's Bay Company. The bear was sent to join the Royal Menagerie, housed at the Tower of London. Although this was the first grizzly bear in England, the king said he would rather have had been given a new tie or a pair of socks.
- Pipaluk, a male polar bear, was the first male polar bear born in captivity in Britain, and, like Brumas, became a major celebrity at Regent's Park Zoo in London during early 1968. His name came from an Inuit term meaning "little one". Pipaluk was moved from London to Poland in 1985 when the Mappin Terraces, which housed the bears, was closed. He died in 1990.
- Rotana, a male Sun Bear, which was subject to media attention in mid-2023 as images of fellow Sun Bears emerged in China seemingly looking like people in bear costumes. Edinburgh Zoo posted online that its own resident Rotana, was indeed a real bear.
- Siku, a male polar bear, was born in November 2011. Abandoned by his mother, who produced insufficient milk to feed him, he was put into care at Skandinavisk Dyrepark (the Scandinavian Wildlife Park, Denmark). A YouTube video of him became an overnight sensation, and invited comparisons with Knut.
- Wilbär, a male polar bear, was born at the Wilhelma Zoo in Stuttgart, Germany, in 2007.

== See also ==
- List of bear species
- List of giant pandas
