= Ivan the Terrible (polar bear) =

Zoo polar bear and killer (born c. 1949)

- Species: Polar bear (Ursus maritimus)
- Sex: Male
- Born: 1948 or 1949
- Known for: Killing three other polar bears at the Griffith Park Zoo
- Residence: Griffith Park Zoo, Los Angeles
- Weight: 900 lb (410 kg)

Ivan the Terrible (born 1948 or 1949) was a 900-pound (410 kg) male polar bear who lived in the Griffith Park Zoo in Los Angeles, California, in the 1950s and 1960s. He killed three other polar bears in his enclosure during this time, and was moved to the Los Angeles Zoo in 1966.

== Life ==
Ivan was born in 1948 or 1949 (Note: Ivan was reportedly 2 years old in 1951) and by 1951 was living in the Griffith Park Zoo in Los Angeles, California. Ivan lived in the zoo throughout the 1950s and into the 1960s. He weighed roughly 900 pounds (410 kg).

=== Killings ===
In September 1961, Ivan killed two polar bears within one week. Ivan's first victim was a female polar bear named Betty Dewline, who he mauled on September 1, 1961. Betty died after one of Ivan's teeth punctured her skull. Ivan's second victim was a smaller male named Bourneven, who was popular among children; his name derived from a Scandinavian word for "children's friend". He and Ivan got into a fight on September 8, 1961. The fight lasted 80 minutes, during which zookeepers attempted to separate the bears using fire hoses. The fight was eventually broken up after several tranquilizing hypodermic needles were fired into Ivan. Police were also on standby with tear gas grenades.

Ivan was condemned to death after his second killing, but was later granted a reprieve, as zookeepers said he "just follows his instincts" and was "too valuable to destroy". At the time, it was reported that Ivan would be placed in solitary confinement to prevent him from harming other polar bears.

Ivan's third killing occurred in April 1963, when he mauled Lena, who had been his mate for 11 years, after she refused his attempts to mate. The struggle, which lasted 90 minutes, was silent and occurred in front of zookeepers who were unable to stop it. Ivan weighed 850 pounds (390 kg) at the time of the killing, while Lena weighed 500 pounds (230 kg). Ivan and Lena previously had four cubs together, and Ivan's first two killings were attributed to his jealousy over Lena.

=== Later life ===
Ivan was moved to the Los Angeles Zoo when it opened in 1966.

== See also ==
- List of individual bears
- List of wild animals from Los Angeles
