= Meatball (bear) =

Wild animal in Los Angeles

- Other names: Glendale Bear; Glen Bearian; Meatball 210; Meatball the Bear
- Species: American black bear (Ursus americanus)
- Sex: Male
- Born: c. 2006 or 2007
- Residence: Lions, Tigers, and Bears Animal Sanctuary, San Diego, California
- Weight: 400–600 lb (181–272 kg)

Meatball, also known as Glendale Bear, Glen Bearian, Meatball 210, and Meatball the Bear, is an American black bear known for his frequent visits to neighborhoods in northern Los Angeles and Glendale, California. He was moved to the Lions, Tigers, and Bears Animal Sanctuary in San Diego, California in 2012.

== Life ==
Meatball was born c. 2006 or 2007. He was later ear-tagged with the number 210.

In March 2012, Meatball made his first known neighborhood visit in Glendale, California, a city in northern Los Angeles County, and by the end of the summer, he had visited similar neighborhoods two more times, this despite the California Department of Fish and Game relocating him more than 100 miles (160 km) after each visit, an ability known as homing. Around this time, Sarah Aujero created a Twitter account for Meatball to document his adventures, which primarily consisted of swimming in backyard pools and going through trash and pet food left out by residents. On one visit, Meatball was discovered in a garage eating a package of frozen meatballs, earning him his nickname, Meatball.

After Meatball's third visit, he was relocated to the Lions, Tigers, and Bears Animal Sanctuary in San Diego, California. Plans to relocate him to a larger sanctuary in Colorado were blocked by state officials after the San Diego facility pledged to build a 6-acre (24,000 m^{2}) $250,000 ($350,594 in 2025) habitat for him. Meatball was not euthanized, the typical response to bears in his situation, due to his popularity online and amongst locals.

In 2013, Meatball was reported to cost the Lions, Tigers, and Bears Animal Sanctuary $10,000 ($13,821 in 2025) per year. The cost for Meatball's habitat had increased to $350,000 ($475,998 in 2025) as of 2014.

Meatball was reported as weighing 400 pounds in 2012, 600 pounds in 2013, 500 pounds in 2014, and 600 pounds again in 2016.

== Intellectual property dispute ==
During Meatball's earliest encounters, Twitter user Sarah Aujero opened an account for him. The account soon had more than 25,000 followers. The following year the Lions, Tigers, and Bears Animal Sanctuary entered into a dispute with Aujero over control of the Twitter account and the rights to the bear's name. Lions, Tigers, and Bears Animal Sanctuary has since copyrighted Meatball 210 and Meatball the Bear, while Aujero began referring to Meatball as Glen Bearian. As of 2016, the two parties are not in contact with each other.

== In popular culture ==
In 2014, Meatball was made the official mascot of the City of Glendale and featured on the Rose Parade float Lets Be Neighbors, which won the Governor's Award for the "Best Depiction of Life in California". Also in 2014, Lions, Tigers, and Bears Animal Sanctuary published a children's book featuring Meatball. Meatball was also featured on The Tonight Show.

== See also ==
- List of individual bears
- List of wild animals from Los Angeles
