= Hank the Tank =

American black bear involved in human-wildlife conflicts

Hank the Tank (also known as Henrietta) is a five-hundred-pound female American black bear that gained attention for repeated interactions with humans in the Lake Tahoe area, resulting in her eventual capture and relocation to Colorado. Known by wildlife officials as Bear 64F, Hank became a symbol of human-wildlife conflict and sparked broader discussions about bear management in populated areas.

== Background ==
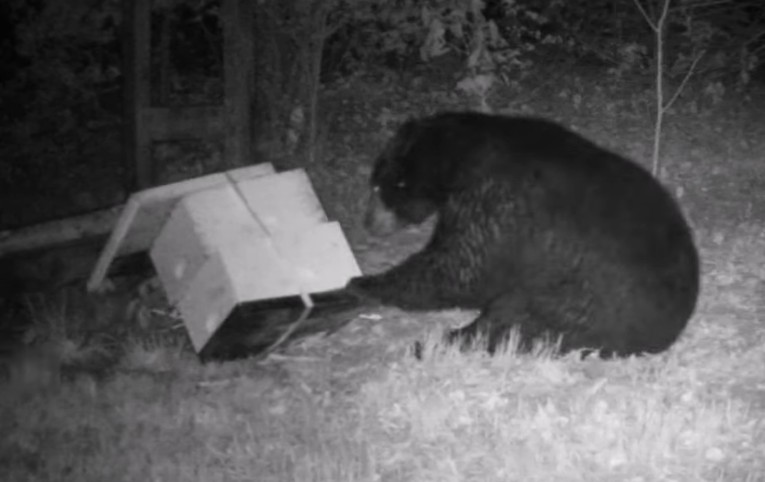
A black bear (Ursus americanus) of the same species as Hank the Tank

Hank, a bear local to the Tahoe Keys region of California, was observed to frequent urban areas in 2021. The California Department of Fish and Wildlife (CDFW) observed that Hank exhibited behavior not considered normal for those in the wild with the primary example of showing a decreased fear of humans. This abnormal behavior was explained by a continuous access to food sources provided by humans, such as but not limited to open or unsecured garbage, which drew her to residential areas while searching for food.

The Lake Tahoe region has had a significant increase in the population of bears in recent years. According to the Tahoe Interagency Bear Team (TIBT), bears have been increasing their presence in the area due to overpopulation, competition for resources, and unsecured trash and bird feeders within residential zones. In the early 2000s the black bear population in Lake Tahoe was estimated to be approximately 120 bears for every 100 square kilometers, the second-highest density recorded in the US.

A result of bears having access to human food often is that they do not hibernate during winter, as is observed in around twenty percent of bears in the Lake Tahoe area. Research has shown that Wildland–urban interfaces are critical areas for human-bear interactions and potential conflicts.

== Incidents ==
Between 2021 and early 2022, Hank was associated with a series of break ins and property damage amounting to around 20 cases in the Tahoe Keys neighborhood. The media started to cover her activities as concerns about safety grew among residents. At one point, it was suspected that Hank's cases rose to as many as thirty homes. However, DNA profiling revealed that multiple bears including Hank were involved in the break-ins.

In 2022, there were a total of 902 conflict calls, 235 home invasions, and 31 permits issued on the Tahoe Basin within the borders of California. The following year, 2023, saw 660 conflict calls, 217 home invasions, and 38 permits issued. This data indicates a significant level of human-bear interaction in the region.

== Relocation and management ==
Due to the high-profile nature of the incidents, the CDFW initially considered euthanizing Hank as a last-resort measure to address public safety concerns. However, DNA evidence indicating that multiple bears were involved prompted the agency to implement a program of tagging and monitoring bears in the region instead. No bears would be killed under this initiative, which relied on DNA sampling to track and identify individual animals associated with break-ins. On August 7, 2023, after over a year of tracking, CDFW officials successfully captured Hank and her three cubs. Hank was transported to The Wild Animal Sanctuary near Springfield, Colorado, while her cubs were placed in Sonoma County Wildlife Rescue to undergo rehabilitation. The aim was to "retrain" the cubs to rely on natural food sources and avoid human environments.

== Public response ==
Hank's association with repeated incidents and a discussion around the possibility of euthanizing Hank generated significant public and media interest. Three wildlife sanctuaries offered to rehome Hank and saw support from the BEAR League, a local bear advocacy organization, who pledged to cover all expenses related to her relocation. Ann Bryant, executive director of the BEAR League, made comments highlighting a strong local opposition to euthanization as a solution. She underlined how Lake Tahoe residents adapted to coexisting with local wildlife and gave names to bears as a form of established community identity.

Hank was presented as a "conflict bear" in the media due to her reliance on human food sources and frequent encounters with Tahoe locals. Her notoriety contributed to broader discussions about human-wildlife interactions, specifically giving rise to debates regarding how best to manage bear populations in urban and semi-urban areas.

== Human-wildlife conflict ==
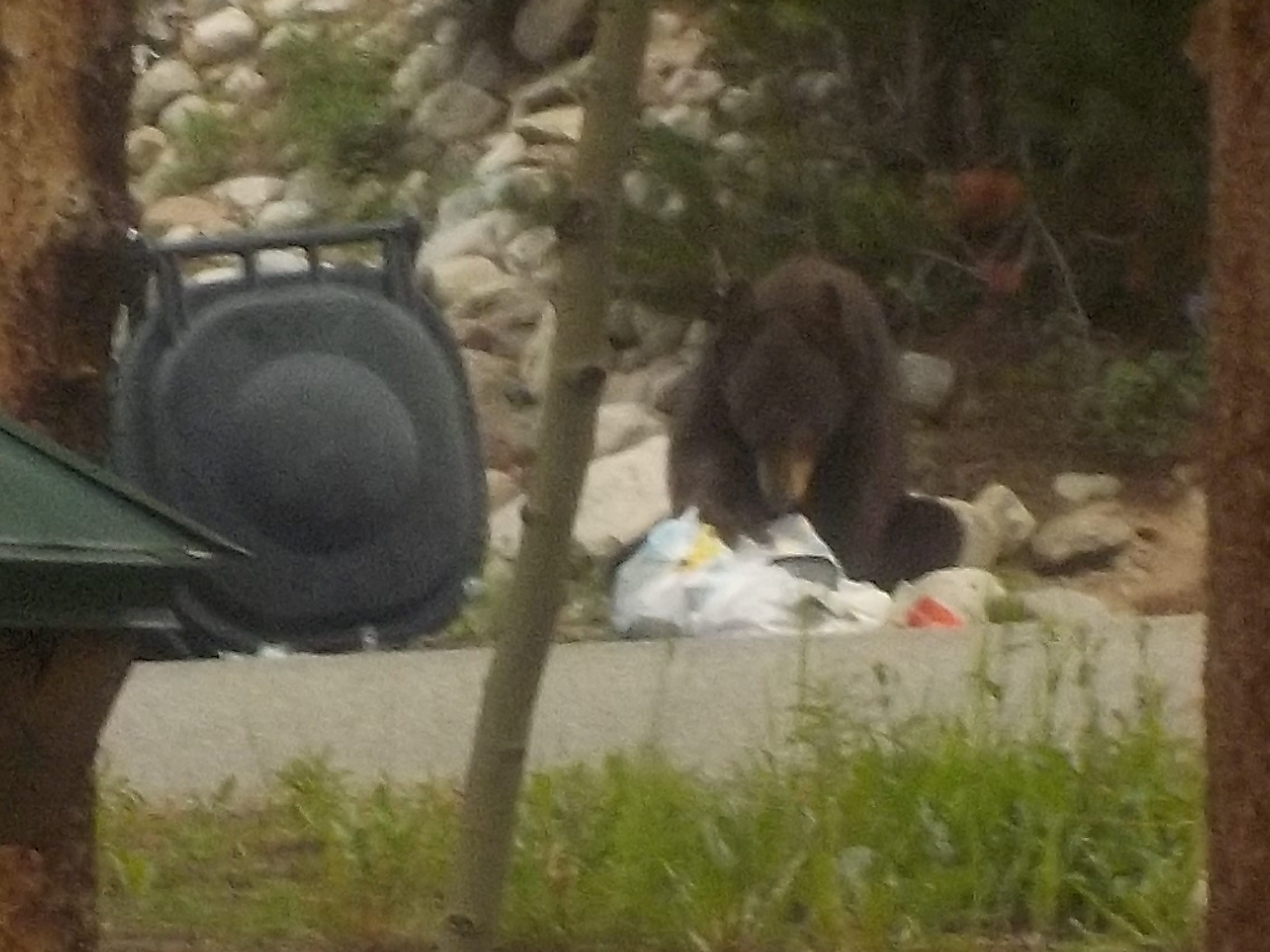
American black bear eating from an unsecured trash bag

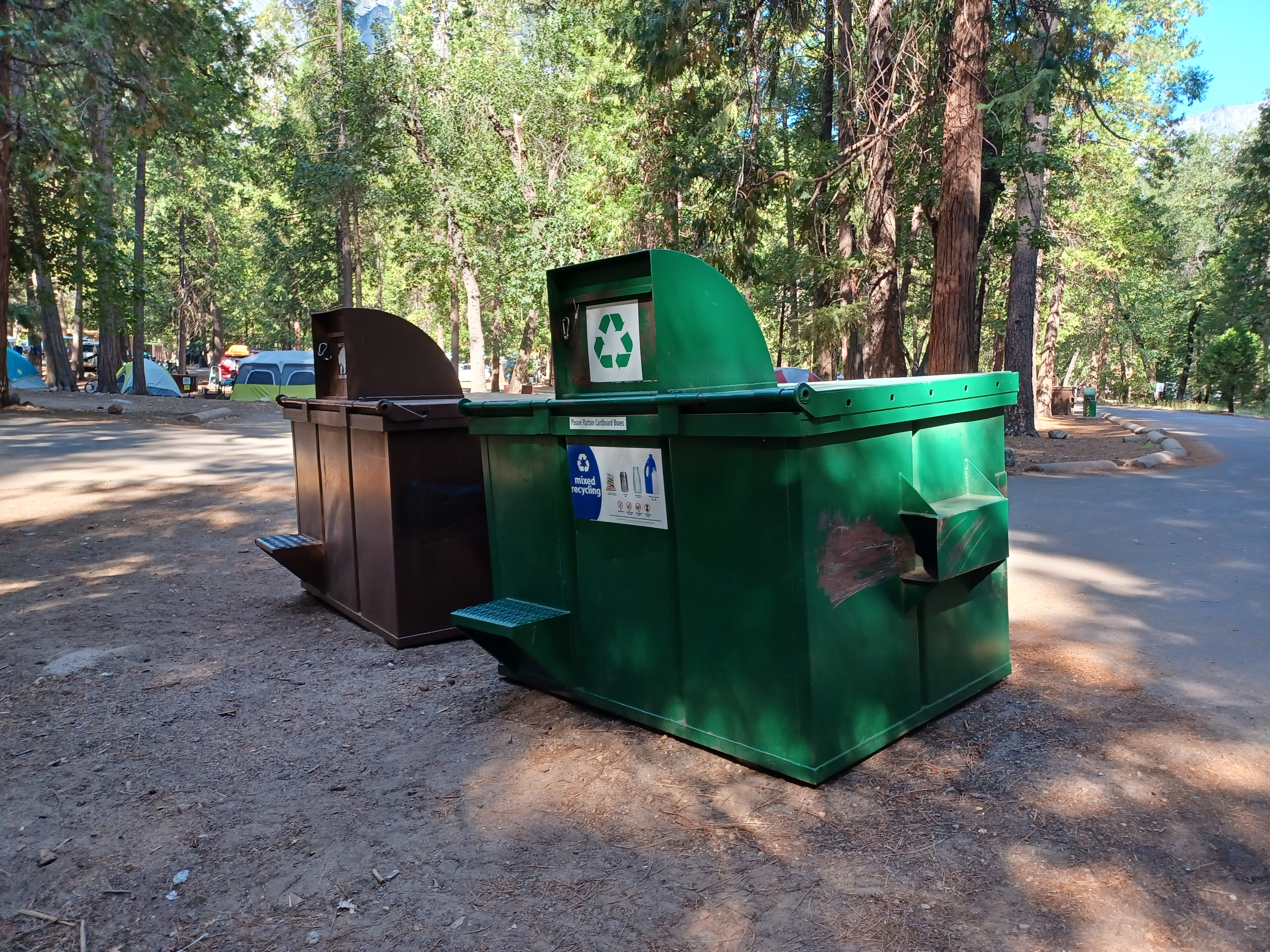
Bear-resistant recycling container in Upper Pines Campground, Yosemite National Park, California, United States.

Hank's case brought the root cause of the human–wildlife conflict seen especially in regions like Lake Tahoe where wildlife and urban communities coexist. In recent years, bears have been becoming relatively more "habituated" to human presence, often due to unsecured garbage and intentional or accidental feeding. This habituation in time breaks their natural fear of people and can lead to increased incidents of property damage and public safety risks.

CDFW describes "conflict bears" as those that have grown accustomed to humans and having a tendency to approach them, very often requiring intervention through relocation or euthanasia. Experts have emphasized that public education on securing food sources and bear-proofing properties is crucial to reducing conflicts and protecting both humans, bear populations, and the natural dynamic of human-bear interaction. Conservationists have been arguing that the case of Hank and her cubs is a call for more effective waste management systems and awareness campaigns in areas with many bears. Authorities hope to reduce human-bear conflicts and allow bears to retain their natural avoidance of humans by promoting responsible practices such as using bear boxes and kodiak cans.

== See also ==
- List of individual bears
- Human–wildlife conflict
- Wildlife management
