= Siku (polar bear) =

Polar bear, internet star

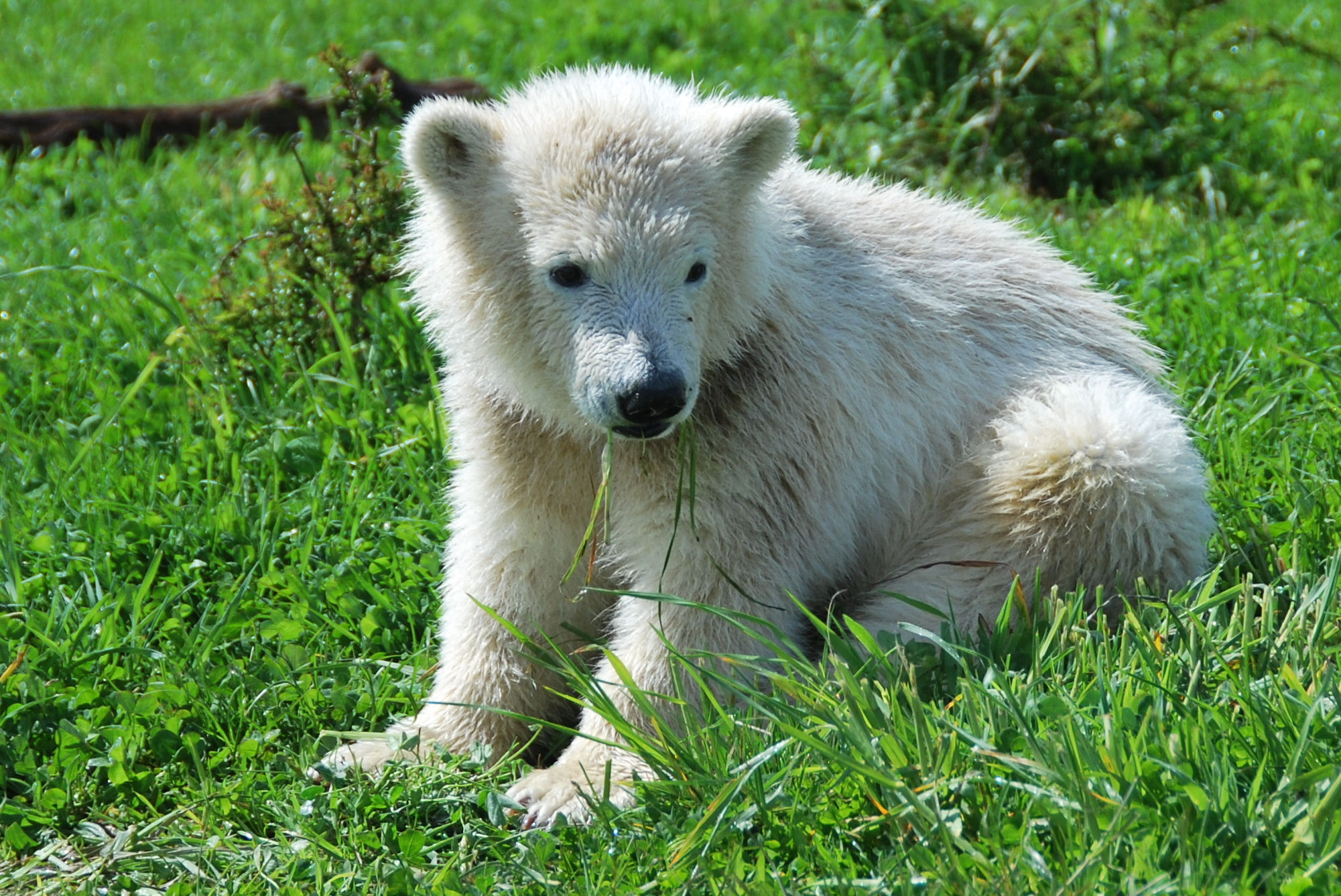
Siku, approximately 6 months old and weighing 34 kg (75 lb)

Siku (born 22 November 2011 in Skandinavisk Dyrepark) is a male polar bear. He has several siblings such as Sné. After his mother failed to produce enough milk to feed him, he was taken into care in the Scandinavian Wildlife Park in Denmark.

In terms of popular appeal, he is by some considered to be a possible successor to the polar bear Knut, who attracted worldwide attention at Berlin Zoo from 2006 until his death in 2011. A YouTube video showing Siku at the age of one month attracted hundreds of thousands of hits in just twenty-four hours and he was hailed internationally as an online sensation, especially after appearing on the official BBC website.

== Biography ==
Siku was born on 22 November 2011 at Skandinavisk Dyrepark ("Scandinavian Wildlife Park") in Djursland, Denmark. According to the Scandinavian Wildlife Park,

The name is symbolic because the polar bears are 100% dependent on sea ice for their survival. Polar bears catch all their prey from the sea ice, so no sea ice – no polar bears. Due to global warming, the sea ice in the Arctic Sea is rapidly diminishing, and the latest forecasts predict that the polar bear may be almost extinct in the wild 40 years from now.

Siku's mother, Ilka, had no milk in her breasts for the third year running, and so the park decided to "immobilize" (anesthetize) her. According to park manager Frank Vigh-Larsen, Siku weighed three pounds (1.8 kg) at birth, but grew within his first month to seven pounds' (3.2 kg) weight. Receiving insufficient milk from Ilka, Siku was revealed on surveillance video inside the bear cave to be "moaning and being unruly all the time." At two days old, he was removed from his mother, as remaining with her could have endangered his life. His mother's defaulting on milk orphaned him, so that he required foster care, a type of ex-situ conservation.

Still blind and deaf at the age of one month, Siku had to be bottle-fed. He was put into care at the Scandinavian Wildlife Park in Kolind, 105 mi (169 km) northwest of Copenhagen, a privately owned zoo housing animals native to Scandinavia including wolves, brown bears, and reindeer. Vigh-Larsen gave Siku 24-hour care in his own apartment at the zoo, with two more people expected to assist in New Year 2012. Vigh-Larsen was quoted as saying, "He likes to be very social between 10 p.m. and 6 a.m. In the first week, he slept in his crate. . . but now he refuses to sleep in there and (instead) sleeps in bed with me."

In spring 2012, Siku was re-introduced to the zoo's five adult polar bears, including his mother, Ilka.

== Video, online stardom and Siku's potential role ==
A video posted on 22 December showed the tiny cub sleeping, stretching, sucking a keeper's finger, and enjoying a back massage from a keeper. Siku's eyes were still closed. The video was viewed thousands of times after first being posted, and has been hailed as a YouTube sensation. Its popularity has invited comparisons with Knut (2006–2011), the polar bear cub raised at Berlin Zoo.

However, Vigh-Larsen emphasizes that he does not want Siku to be too heavily compared to Knut, to deter extensive merchandise production and huge numbers of visitors: "What happened to Knut was a disaster. He was used in order to sell teddy-bears and tickets. Therefore, we are doing everything we can in order to distance Siku from Knut as much as possible," he stresses. Instead, Vigh-Larsen hopes that Siku will serve as an "Ambassador and communicator for the Arctic area and the climate changes which occur up there."

== See also ==
- List of individual bears
- Wildlife conservation
- Ex-situ conservation
