= Gita (elephant) =

Asian elephant

Gita was a 48-year-old Asian elephant who died at the Los Angeles Zoo on June 10, 2006. Gita's death prompted dozens of animal rights activists, including In Defense of Animals, to accuse the zoo of neglecting and endangering its animals by placing them in unsatisfactory living conditions, and fueled a years-long debate in the city government over the ethics of keeping elephants in a zoo at all.

== Life at the zoo ==
Gita came to the Griffith Park Zoo from India in 1959. She was the most placid of the zoo's elephants, and was taken on a walkabout around the zoo each morning before it opened. She led the procession of elephants across Griffith Park to the Los Angeles Zoo when it opened and Griffith Park Zoo closed in 1966.

For 2 1/2 years prior to her death, Gita and another female elephant, Ruby, were kept in a small, behind-the-scenes barn with a concrete floor, which activists claim exacerbated Gita's joint and foot problems. Gita suffered from osteomyelitis and arthritis, and underwent an operation in September 2005 to remove an infected bone from one of her toes. She was fitted with a specially-made shoe at the time. A veterinarian examined her on the Friday before her death and gave her a good report.

== Death ==
A zoo worker reportedly saw Gita "in distress" on the night of June 9, but did not report it to staff. Two keepers discovered her the following morning and tried to save her, without success. The night keeper who failed to report her in distress later resigned. According to In Defense of Animals, Gita had collapsed and was unable to arise for as long as 17 hours before she finally died.

On June 11, the day after Gita's death, two dozen animal rights activists protested at the zoo's gates, calling on the zoo to move its remaining two elephants, Ruby and Billy, to a more spacious animal sanctuary. Activists and members of the Los Angeles Indian community held a memorial service for Gita on June 14. A Hindu priest from Malibu officiated at the ceremony.

== Investigation and fine ==
A USDA investigation into the deaths of Gita and a chimpanzee named Judeo cited the Los Angeles Zoo for violations and imposed a fine of $3,281. The zoo paid the fine in January 2008, but its signing of the agreement did not admit culpability for the violations. According to the agreement, the zoo "failed to assure an elephant received veterinary care in adequate time. Elephant Gita was found in an awkward position around 9 p.m., and veterinarians were not alerted to Gita's condition until around 5 a.m. the next day".

A necropsy reported blockages in the right chamber and major vessels of the elephant's heart, citing the cause of death as heart failure brought on by blood clots which had begun forming 3 to 5 days before death. The study could not determine whether inattention to Gita's heart condition contributed to her death.

Gita is either the 12th or the 14th elephant to die at the Los Angeles Zoo since 1968. There have been only four elephant deaths since 1992, when the zoo changed its policy of keeping elephants all night in barns with concrete floors and instead provided dirt yards that are easier on their feet. According to John Lewis, zoo director, "Despite how we took care of them, we're paying the price for how they were treated in their earlier lives — no exercise, being kept on concrete."

== Public outcry ==
In response to the deaths of Gita and other elephants at the L.A. Zoo, public opposition to the keeping of elephants on zoo grounds continued for the next 2 1/2 years. In May 2007, Ruby, the zoo's 45-year-old African elephant, was moved to a northern California sanctuary. In January 2009, the Los Angeles City Council held a final vote approving plans to create a $42 million, six-acre elephant sanctuary at the L.A. Zoo called Pachyderm Forest.

Activists protested the decision, claiming the expansion was not big enough to guarantee the elephants' survival in captivity. They were supported by celebrities who also appeared before the city council, including Cher, Lily Tomlin and Robert Culp. Former game show host Bob Barker had earlier offered to pay $1.5 million to move the zoo's last elephant, Billy, to a northern California sanctuary.

== See also ==
- List of individual elephants
- List of wild animals from Los Angeles
