= Yellow 2291 =

Wild bear in Los Angeles

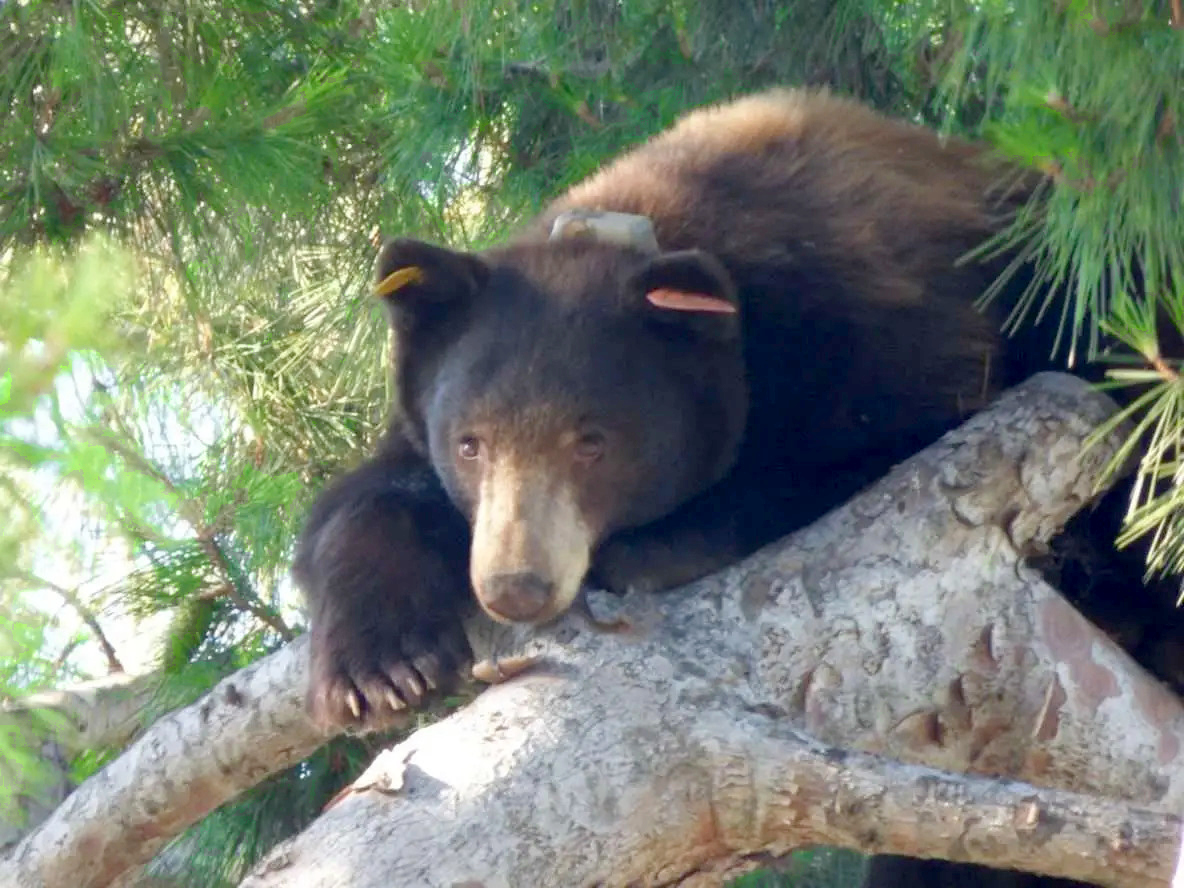
- 2291 in 2024
- Other names: BB-14; Black Bear 14
- Species: American black bear (Ursus americanus)
- Sex: Female
- Born: c. 2020
- Residence: Santa Monica Mountains
- Offspring: 3
- Weight: approx. 175 lb (79 kg)

Yellow 2291, also known as BB-14, is a wild female American black bear who lives in the Santa Monica Mountains in Los Angeles and Ventura counties. She birthed three offspring in January 2025, and together they were the first bear family in the Santa Monica Mountains in decades.

== Life ==
Yellow 2291 was first captured by the California Department of Fish and Wildlife in Claremont in May 2024, at which time she was estimated to be 3–5 years old. After her capture, she was moved to the Angeles National Forest, after which she was tracked through the Santa Susana Mountains, Simi Hills, and Santa Monica Mountains to Malibu, a journey of more than 100 miles (160 km) and across four major freeways.

Yellow 2291 was captured a second time in July 2024, this time while stuck in a tree in Chatsworth. She was again taken to Angeles Forest, and in the month after her second relocation, she returned to Malibu, a behavior known as homing.

In January 2025, Yellow 2291 birthed three cubs (two male, one female) while in the Topanga Canyon area of the Santa Monica Mountains. Since then, the family has been repeatedly spotted in the mountain range, making them the first bear family to live in the Santa Monica Mountains in decades. Yellow 2291's mate is believed to live in the Angeles National Forest, as there are no known male black bears in the Santa Monica Mountains.

In fall 2025, Yellow 2291's age was estimated at 4–6 or 5–7 years old. She weighed approximately 175 pounds (79 kg) and her den was located near the Palisades fire burn scar, though she was unaffected by the fire as she was hibernating at the time. She was spotted in Encino in June 2026; she was alone at the time, her offspring likely on their own due to their age. At the time of her sighting, her GPS collar battery had recently died .

== Name ==
Yellow 2291 is named after the color of her GPS collar. She is also named BB-14, as she is the fourteenth black bear tracked by the National Park Service since 2005.

== Significance ==
Extensive roaming is more typical in male black bears than females, and as such, California Department of Fish and Wildlife scientists describe Yellow 2291's roaming as "remarkable" and "some of the most interesting ... we've ever seen." Her ability to cross freeways may also influence the future locations of wildlife crossings, the first of which, Wallis Annenberg Wildlife Crossing, is already being constructed across U.S. 101 in Agoura Hills. Yellow 2291 was tracked crossing U.S. 101 in this area, though the location of the crossing was chosen earlier, based on the movements of numerous mountain lions.

== See also ==
- List of individual bears
- List of wild animals from Los Angeles
- Fauna of the Santa Monica Mountains
