= Skandinavisk Dyrepark =

Coordinates: 56°20′40″N 10°39′09″E

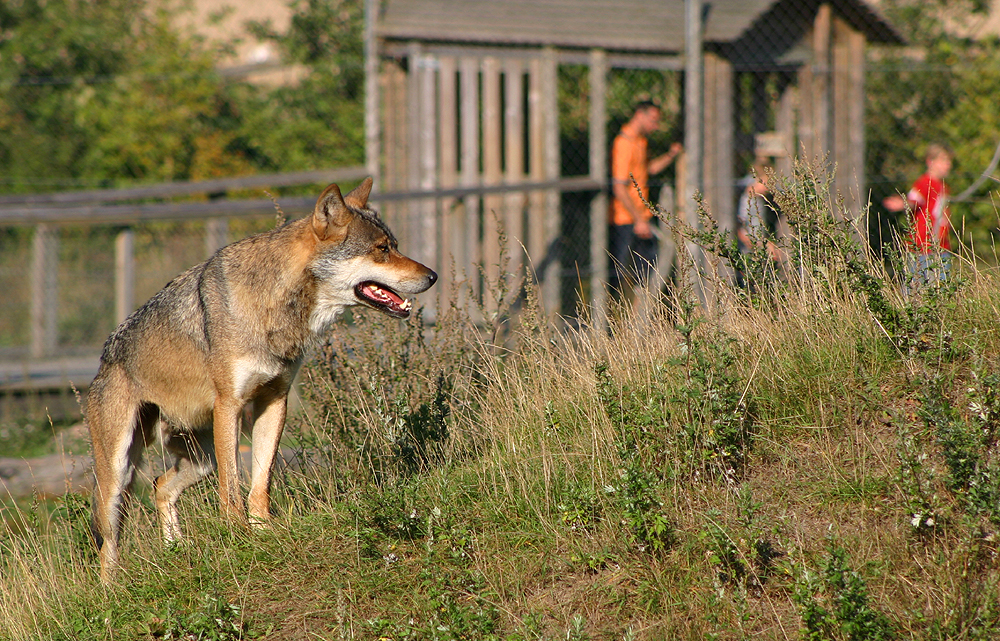
- A grey wolf in the park
- Interactive map of Skandinavisk Dyrepark
- Date opened: 1994
- Location: Djursland, Syddjurs Municipality, Denmark
- Land area: 45 hectares (110 acres)
- No. of animals: c. 300
- No. of species: c. 20
- Website: Skandinavisk Dyrepark

Skandinavisk Dyrepark (Scandinavian Wildlife Park) is a Danish zoo in Djursland, located in Syddjurs Municipality in Denmark.

Opened for public in 1994, by the name Hjortenes verden (World of deer), later changed to Skandinavisk Dyrepark (Scandinavian Wildlife Park). As suggested by its name, the focus of the park is wildlife native to Scandinavia.

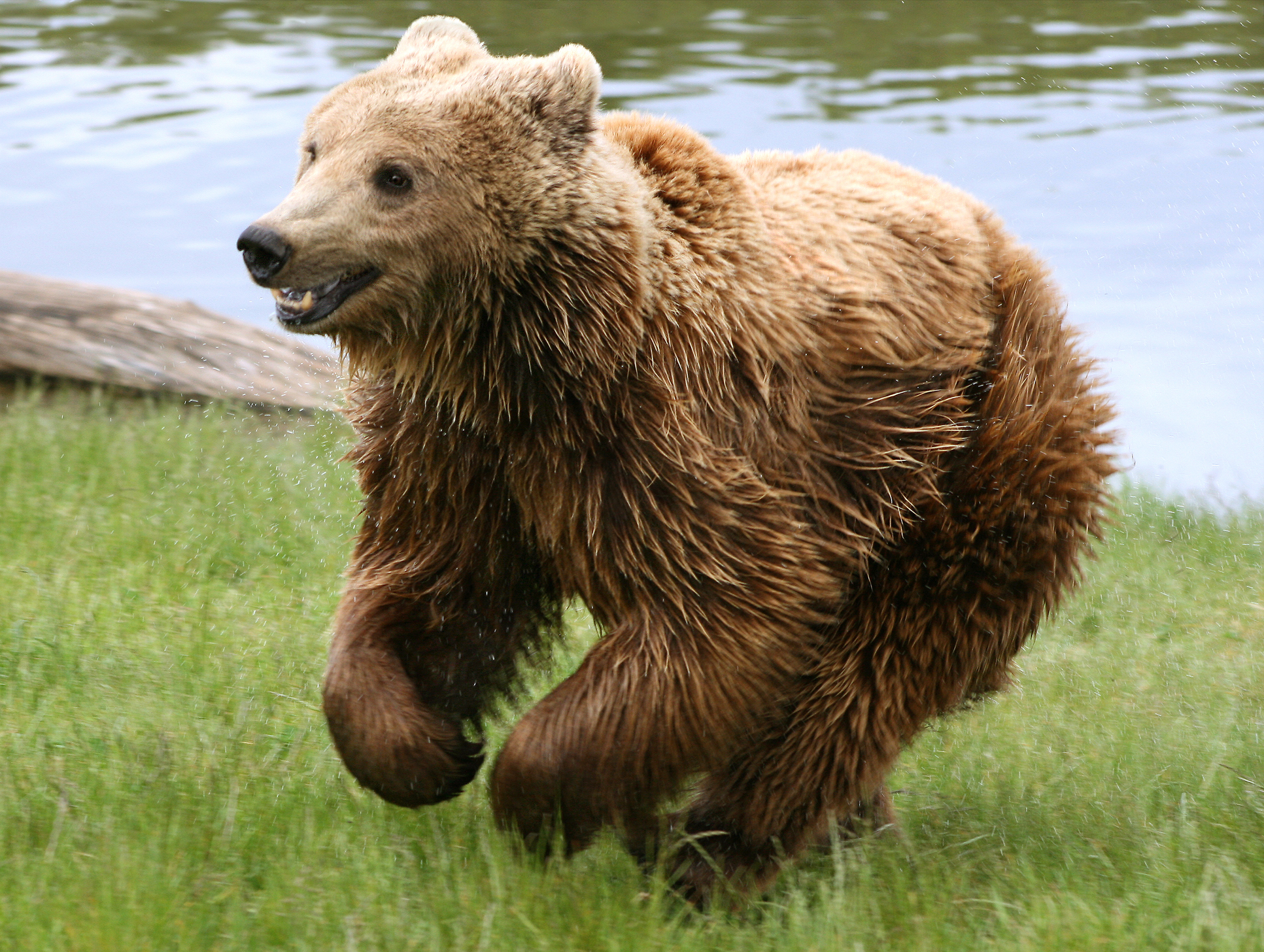
Running brown bear at the park

The exhibits for polar bears, brown bears and grey wolves cover 2.6 hectares (6.4 acres), 2.5 hectares (6.2 acres) and 1.5 hectares (3.7 acres) respectively, and are among the largest of their kind in the world. The zoo got worldwide attention by the birth of the polar bear Siku in 2011.

== Siku ==
Siku (born 22 November 2011 in Skandinavisk Dyrepark) is a male polar bear cub. He has several siblings such as Sné. After his mother failed to produce enough milk to feed him, he was taken into care by the park staff.

In terms of popular appeal, Siku is by some considered to be a possible successor to the polar bear Knut, who attracted worldwide attention at Berlin Zoo from 2006 until his death in 2011. A YouTube video showing Siku at the age of one month attracted hundreds of thousands of hits in just twenty-four hours and he was hailed internationally as an online sensation, especially after appearing on the official BBC website.
