= Nora (polar bear) =

Polar bear at the Oregon Zoo

- Nora in 2017
- Species: Polar bear
- Sex: Female
- Born: November 6, 2015 (age 10); Columbus Zoo and Aquarium

Nora (born November 6, 2015) is a polar bear at Henry Vilas Zoo in Madison, Wisconsin. She was born at the Columbus Zoo and Aquarium in Ohio and later lived at the Hogle Zoo in Utah and the Oregon Zoo.

== History ==
Nora was born at the Columbus Zoo and Aquarium on November 6, 2015, along with her twin.

Nora first arrived at the Oregon Zoo as a cub in 2016. She was moved to the Hogle Zoo in 2017 during work on the polar bear habitat in Portland, returning to the Oregon Zoo in 2021.

In 2019, Nora broke a bone and required surgery. She has been credited for helping with Arctic conservation efforts.

In 2026, Nora was relocated to the Henry Vilas Zoo so that she could join their breeding program.

Nora weighs approximately 500 pounds. She has been described as a "fan-favorite". A book has been written about her.

== See also ==
- List of individual bears
