= Lists of individual animals =

There are several lists of individual animals on Wikipedia. These are lists of notable, non-fictional, specific animals (as opposed to groups of categories of animals).

== By species ==
- List of individual apes
- Oldest hominids
- List of individual bears
  - List of giant pandas
- List of individual birds
- List of individual bovines
- List of individual cats
  - List of longest-living cats
- List of individual cetaceans
  - List of captive orcas
- List of individual dogs
  - List of longest-living dogs
- List of individual elephants
- List of individual hippopotamids
- List of historical horses
- List of individual monkeys
- List of individual pigs
- List of individual seals and sea lions
- List of wolves

== By role ==
- List of animal actors
- List of animals awarded human credentials
- List of animals in political office
- List of leading Thoroughbred racehorses
- List of racehorses
- List of wealthiest animals
