= Griffith Park Zoo =

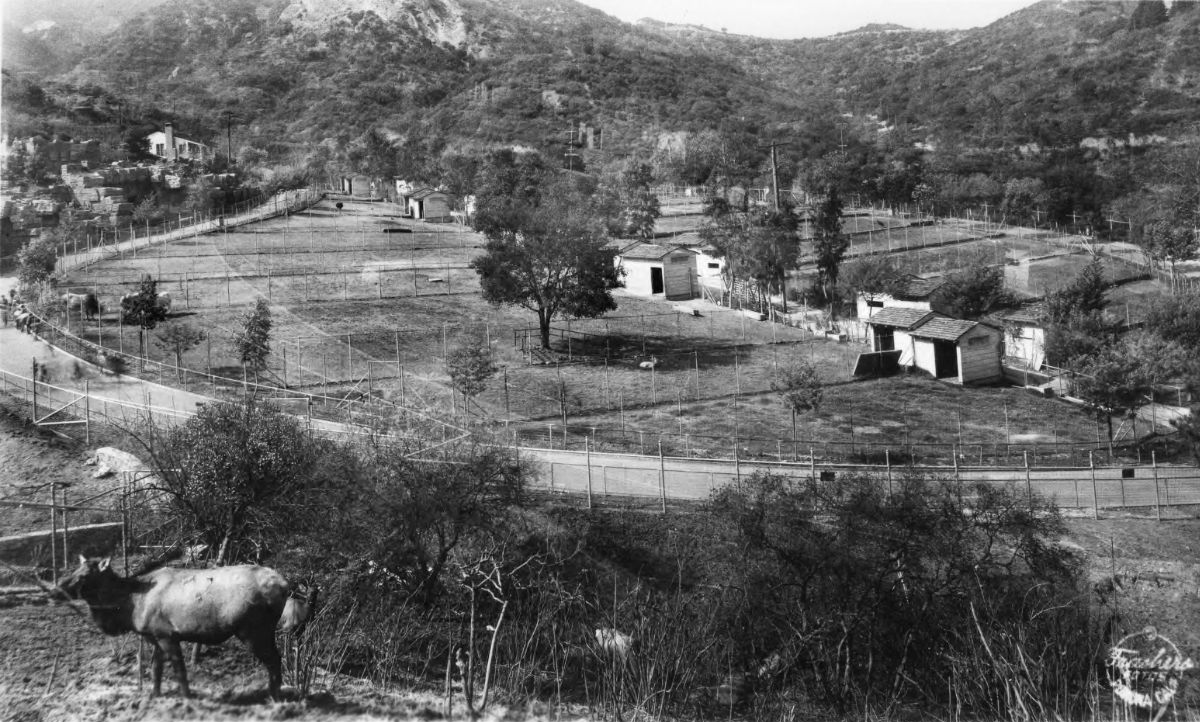
- Griffith Park Zoo in 1940
- Interactive map of Griffith Park Zoo
- 34.1337°N 118.2888°W
- Date opened: 1912
- Date closed: August 1966
- Location: Los Angeles, California

Griffith Park Zoo, referred to today as the Old Los Angeles Zoo, is a city-owned former zoo now in ruins, located in Griffith Park in Los Angeles, California. The zoo opened in 1912, closed in 1966 with the opening of the Los Angeles Zoo, and now features animal enclosure ruins, picnic areas, and multiple hiking trails.

== History ==
Los Angeles's first zoo, Eastlake Zoo in East Los Angeles, opened in 1885. Griffith Park Zoo opened with fifteen animals in 1912. It was built on the site of Griffith J. Griffith's defunct ostrich farm. In the mid-1920s, film producer William Nicholas Selig donated many animals from his studio, which he had previously attempted to convert into an animal theme park.

Griffith Park Zoo was expanded by the Works Progress Administration in the 1930s. Most of the zoo's new enclosures were built in the caves-with-iron-bars style that was standard at the time.

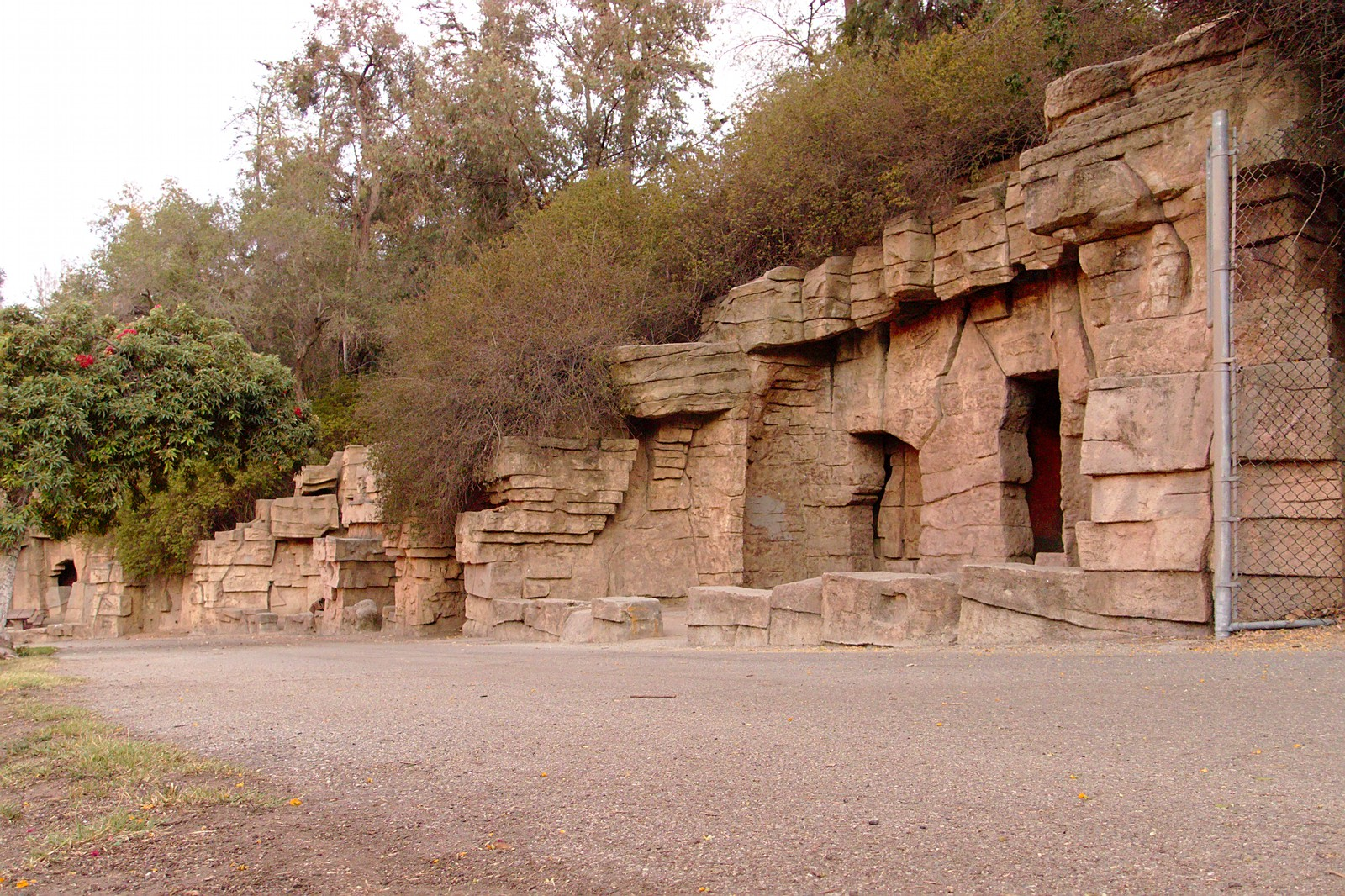
Zoo ruins in 2013

As Los Angeles grew, Griffith Park Zoo was increasingly criticized as an "inadequate, ugly, poorly designed and under-financed collection of beat-up cages," this despite the zoo drawing more than two million visitors a year. In 1958, the city passed an $8 million ($89.3 million in 2025) bond measure to create a new zoo. Griffith Park Zoo closed eight years later, with its animals transferred to the new zoo two miles away. The old zoo's animal enclosures were left as ruins, with picnic tables installed in some of them.

== Animal residents ==
Notable animals that lived at Griffith Park Zoo include Gita the Elephant, Ivan the Terrible, and Topsy the Camel.
