= Reggie (alligator) =

American alligator at the Los Angeles Zoo

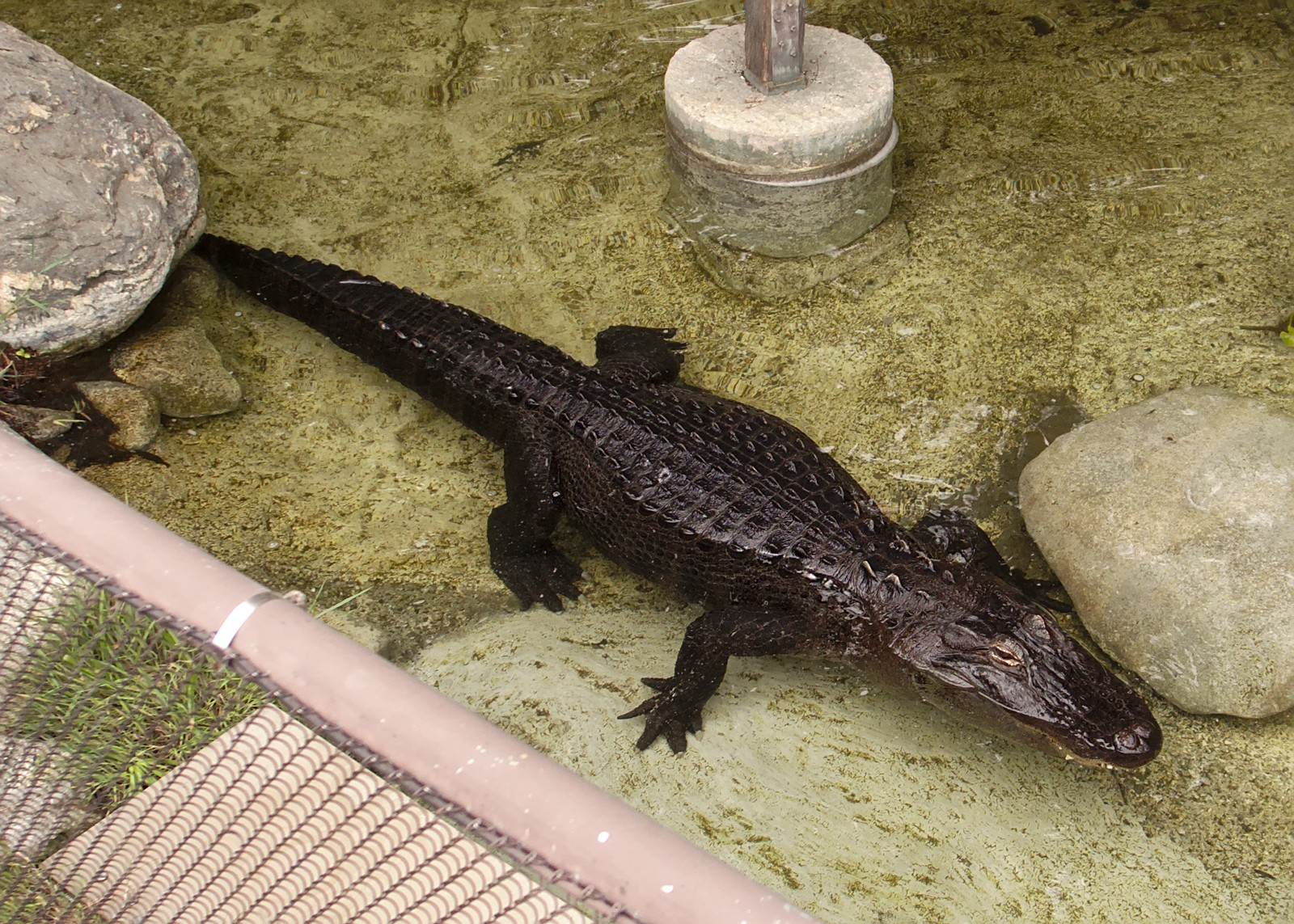
Reggie at the Los Angeles Zoo in 2014

Reggie is the name of an American alligator, believed to have been raised in illegal captivity, who became feral and was sighted for two extended periods at Ken Malloy Harbor Regional Park in the South Bay, Los Angeles area in 2005 and 2007. The animal is now in captivity at Los Angeles Zoo.

== History ==
=== First appearance ===
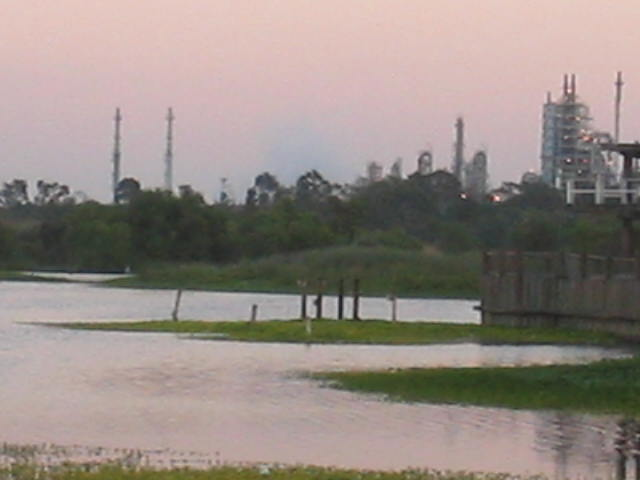
Lake Machado

Reggie was first seen swimming in Machado Lake at Harbor City, California's Kenneth Malloy Memorial Park in August 2005. He became a media sensation shortly thereafter, receiving coverage as far away as Europe, and eventually inspiring a website, a line of merchandise, and even becoming the unofficial mascot for nearby Los Angeles Harbor College.

Two men from San Pedro, California, suspected of illegally raising exotic animals, were arrested in August 2005 in connection with releasing Reggie into the lake.

City officials immediately set efforts in motion to apprehend him. The entire 53-acre (21 ha) lake was cordoned off and several professional "gator wranglers" were hired. But despite a nearly three-month-long effort, Reggie managed to elude capture and began making fewer and fewer appearances until he seemed to disappear altogether. Until May 2007, Reggie was believed to be either in hibernation or dead. "Crocodile Hunter" Steve Irwin pledged that if the American alligator ever re-emerged, he and his crew would go to the lake and attempt a capture.

In September 2005, officials searching for Reggie discovered a smaller American alligator in one of the storm drains connected to the lake. This American alligator was dubbed "Little Reggie".

=== Return and capture ===
On April 30, 2007, roughly a year and a half after he was last seen, Reggie emerged on the surface of the lake and appeared to be at least a foot longer than at his last sighting 18 months earlier. Fencing was put up again and more specialists were contacted to try to bring him in; he was once again in the media spotlight.

On May 24, 2007, Reggie stepped out of the water and went over to a 300-foot (91 m) area of dry land. Officials who were there quickly seized the opportunity and cornered him. Joined by a colleague, Los Angeles Zoo reptile keeper Ian Recchio jumped on his back, threw a T-shirt over his head, and wrapped duct tape around his snout. He was seven feet long at the time of his capture. By May 26, Reggie had been moved to the LA Zoo.

=== Los Angeles Zoo ===
In 2010, Los Angeles Zoo officials moved Cajun Kate, a female American alligator, into the same habitat as Reggie, but the two ultimately could not live together and Cajun Kate was moved to the St. Augustine Alligator Farm Zoological Park. In August 2016, Los Angeles Zoo officials moved Tina, a female American alligator, into Reggie's habitat. By March 2017, the zoo announced that Reggie and Tina would remain in the same habitat permanently. As of 2022 he was around eight feet long and weighed 250 pounds.

== Public art ==
On May 21, 2016, artist Kent Yoshimura placed a 23-ft sculpture of an alligator in Echo Park Lake. In his interview with NBC, he cites Reggie the Alligator as an inspiration to his piece.

== See also ==
- Pui Pui (crocodile), in Hong Kong
- List of wild animals from Los Angeles
