= Chevrolet Suburban =

Series of American full-size automobiles by General Motors

Chevrolet and GMC Suburban GMC Yukon XL Chevrolet Veraneio
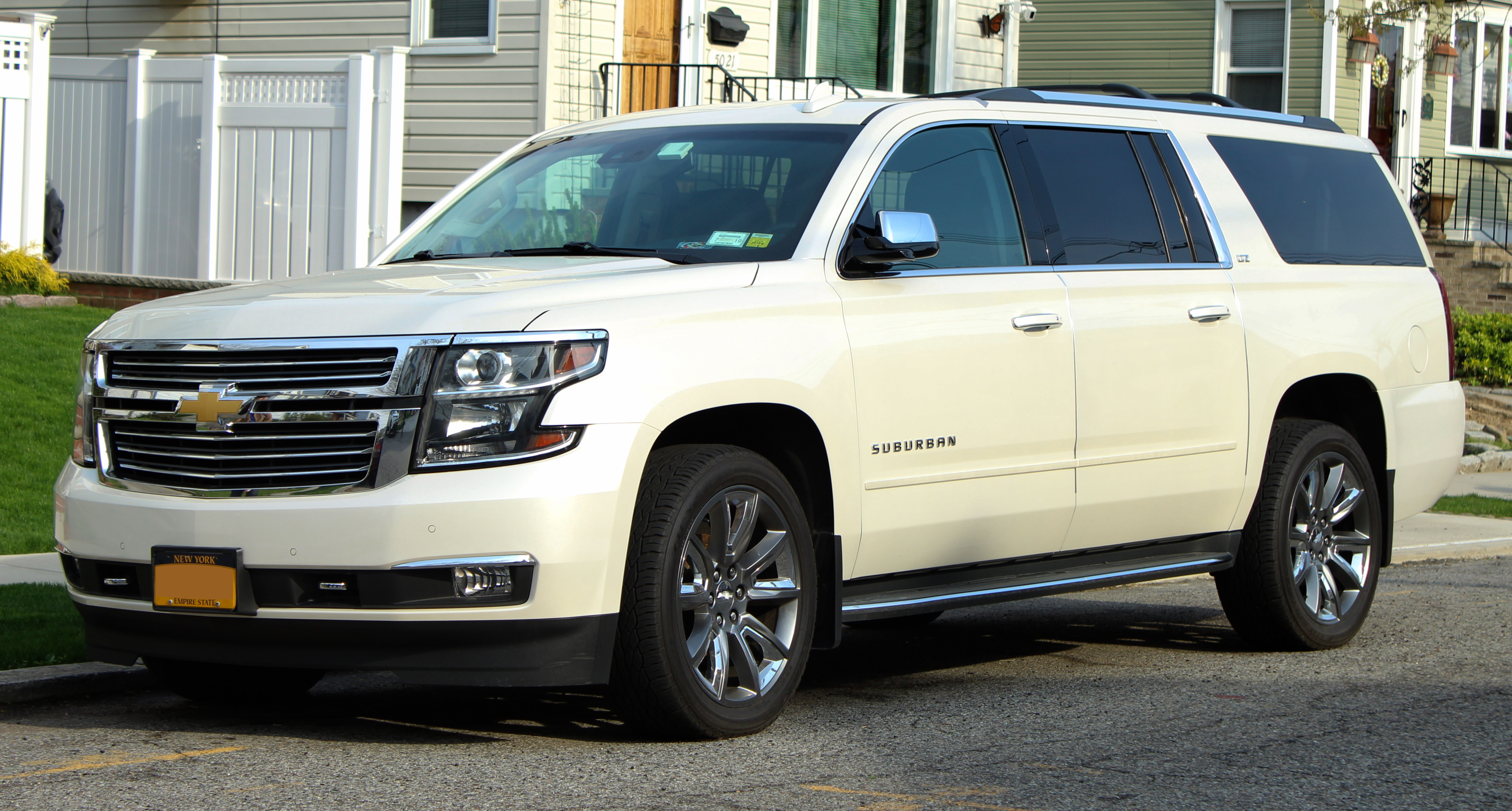
- 2015 Chevrolet Suburban 1500 LTZ

Overview
- Manufacturer: General Motors
- Also called: Chevrolet Veraneio (Brazil, 1964–1995); GMC Carryall (1960–1972); GMC Suburban (1937–1999); GMC Yukon XL (from 2000); Holden Suburban (Australia/New Zealand, 1998–2001)
- Production: 1934–present

Body and chassis
- Class: Full-size station wagon (1935–1959); Full-size SUV (1960–present)
- Layout: Front engine, rear-wheel drive / four-wheel drive
- Chassis: Body-on-frame
- Related: Chevrolet Silverado/GMC Sierra; Chevrolet Tahoe/GMC Yukon; Cadillac Escalade

The Chevrolet Suburban is a series of SUVs built by Chevrolet since 1934. The longest-produced automobile nameplate in the world, the Suburban is currently in its twelfth generation, in production since the 2021 model year. Beginning life as one of the first metal-bodied station wagons, the Suburban is the progenitor of the modern full-size sport utility vehicle, combining a wagon-style body with the chassis and powertrain of a pickup truck. Alongside its Advance Design, Task Force, and C/K predecessors, the Chevrolet Silverado currently shares chassis and mechanical commonality with the Suburban and other trucks.

Traditionally one of the most profitable vehicles sold by General Motors, the Suburban has been marketed through both Chevrolet and GMC for nearly its entire production. In addition to sharing the Suburban name with Chevrolet, GMC has used several nameplates for the model line, having marketed it as the GMC Yukon XL since 2000, while Cadillac has marketed it as the Cadillac Escalade ESV since 2003. During the 1990s, GM Australia marketed right-hand drive Suburbans under the Holden brand.

The Suburban is sold in the United States, Canada, Mexico, Central America, Chile, Dominican Republic, Bolivia, Peru, Philippines, and the Middle East (except Israel), while the Yukon XL is sold only in North America (exclusive to the United States, Canada, and Mexico) and the Middle East territories (except Israel).

A 2018 iSeeCars.com study identified the Chevrolet Suburban as the car that is driven the most each year. A 2019 iSeeCars.com study named the Chevrolet Suburban the second-ranked longest-lasting vehicle. In December 2019, the Hollywood Chamber of Commerce unveiled a Hollywood Walk of Fame star for the Suburban, noting that the car had been in "1,750 films and TV shows since 1952."

== History ==
Several automotive companies in the United States used the "Suburban" designation to indicate a windowed, station wagon–type body on a commercial frame, including DeSoto, Dodge, Plymouth, Studebaker, and Nash, in addition to Chevrolet and GMC. The (Westchester) Suburban name was, in fact, a trademark of U.S. Body and Forging Co. of Tell City, Indiana, which built wooden station wagon bodies for all of these automobile and light truck chassis and more.

Chevrolet began production of its all-steel "carryall-suburban" in 1934. GMC brought out its version in 1937. These vehicles were also known as the "Suburban Carryall" until General Motors shortened the name to simply "Suburban". GMC's equivalent to the Chevrolet model was originally named "Suburban" as well, until it was rebranded as "Yukon XL" for the 2000 model year.

With the end of production of the Plymouth Fury Suburban station wagon in 1978, only GM continued to manufacture a vehicle branded as a "Suburban", and GM was awarded an exclusive trademark on the name in 1988. The Chevrolet Suburban is one of the largest SUVs on the market today. It has outlasted competitive vehicles such as the International Harvester Travelall, Jeep Wagoneer, and the Ford Excursion. The latest competitor is the extended-length Ford Expedition EL, which indirectly replaced the Excursion.

The Suburban as of today is a full-size SUV (upgraded to extended-length from 1967 onward to make room for the K5 Blazer that debuted in 1969) with three rows of seating, a full pickup truck frame, and V8 engine. It is one of the few station wagons available with all bench seating rows. The Suburban is the same height and width as the Chevrolet Tahoe, except that the Suburban is 15–20 inches (380–510 mm) longer. The extra length provides a full-sized cargo area behind the nine-passenger seating area.

From 1973 to 2013, it had been available in half-ton and 3/4-ton versions. Chevrolet discontinued the 3/4-ton option for the public during the tenth-generation model's tenure after 2013 because of slow sales. However, for the 2016 model year, a one-ton model debuted as an exclusive to rental, fleet, and government services as the eleventh generation in 4WD and with LS and LT trim options, but soft sales would result in Chevrolet discontinuing production on this model after 2019.

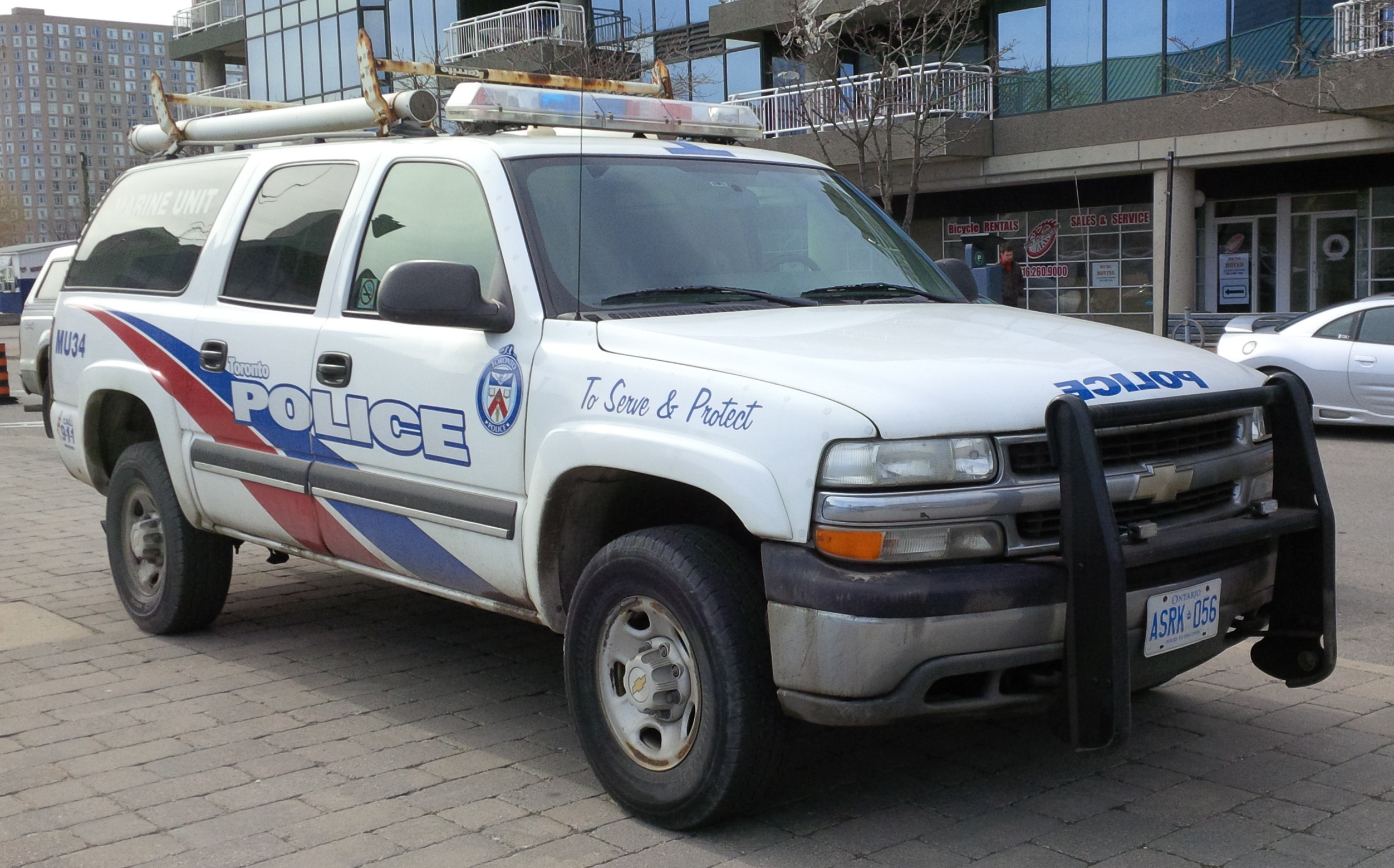
A ninth-generation Suburban being used as a police truck in Toronto

In recent years, the Suburban has been used as a police truck, fire chief's vehicle, and EMS vehicle. Suburbans are also used as taxicab livery and limousines. Gothic black Suburban vehicles are commonly used by federal intelligence services such as the Secret Service. The Secret Service operates fully armored versions of the Suburban for the President of the United States when he attends less formal engagements. The Suburban (as well as the Tahoe and GMC variants) is very popular with the Federal Bureau of Investigation as a service vehicle.

In the late 1990s, GM also introduced a RHD version of the Suburban, badged as a Holden, for the Australian market. Sales were low and GM withdrew the model in 2000 from Holden's lineup. In 2019, Chevrolet considered bringing the Suburban back to the region as a converted RWD import through Holden Special Vehicles (albeit with the Chevrolet badge), but chose to hold off on those plans due to numerous factors, including the situation involving GM's decision to retire the Holden brand in 2020.

In 2015, the Suburban commemorated its 80th anniversary at General Motors' Arlington Assembly Plant, where the 10 millionth Suburban was produced. A video was posted on Chevrolet's YouTube channel about its 80-year legacy.

On February 26, 2018, Car and Driver magazine posted an article celebrating the vehicle's 83rd year, noting that the Suburban's longevity is due to being one of GM's best-selling models, its appeal to customers across the board regardless of race, gender, class, or political affiliation, and a unique loyalty to the SUV. In an interview from Chevrolet's truck/SUV marketing executive Sandor Piszar, who recalls an event celebrating the truck division's 100th anniversary when they asked about what they named their vehicles, "It's a funny question, but it really is an intriguing point [...] People name what they love. And they love their Suburbans."

On December 5, 2019, the Chevrolet Suburban became the first vehicle to be awarded a star on the Hollywood Walk of Fame by the Hollywood Chamber of Commerce for its excellence in film and television, having appeared in more than 1,750 films and television series since 1952, and can also claim to have appeared in at least one television series every year since 1956, and at least one film every year since 1960, the most ever for an automobile of any type. The star, placed at the corner of Hollywood Boulevard and Highland Avenue, also carried the Chevrolet "Bowtie" symbol instead of the entertainment symbols (film, stage, television, radio, musical instruments, and recording artist), another first for the Walk of Fame.

There have been a total of twelve generations of Chevrolet Suburbans since its 1934 debut.

== First generation (1935) ==
1935–1940
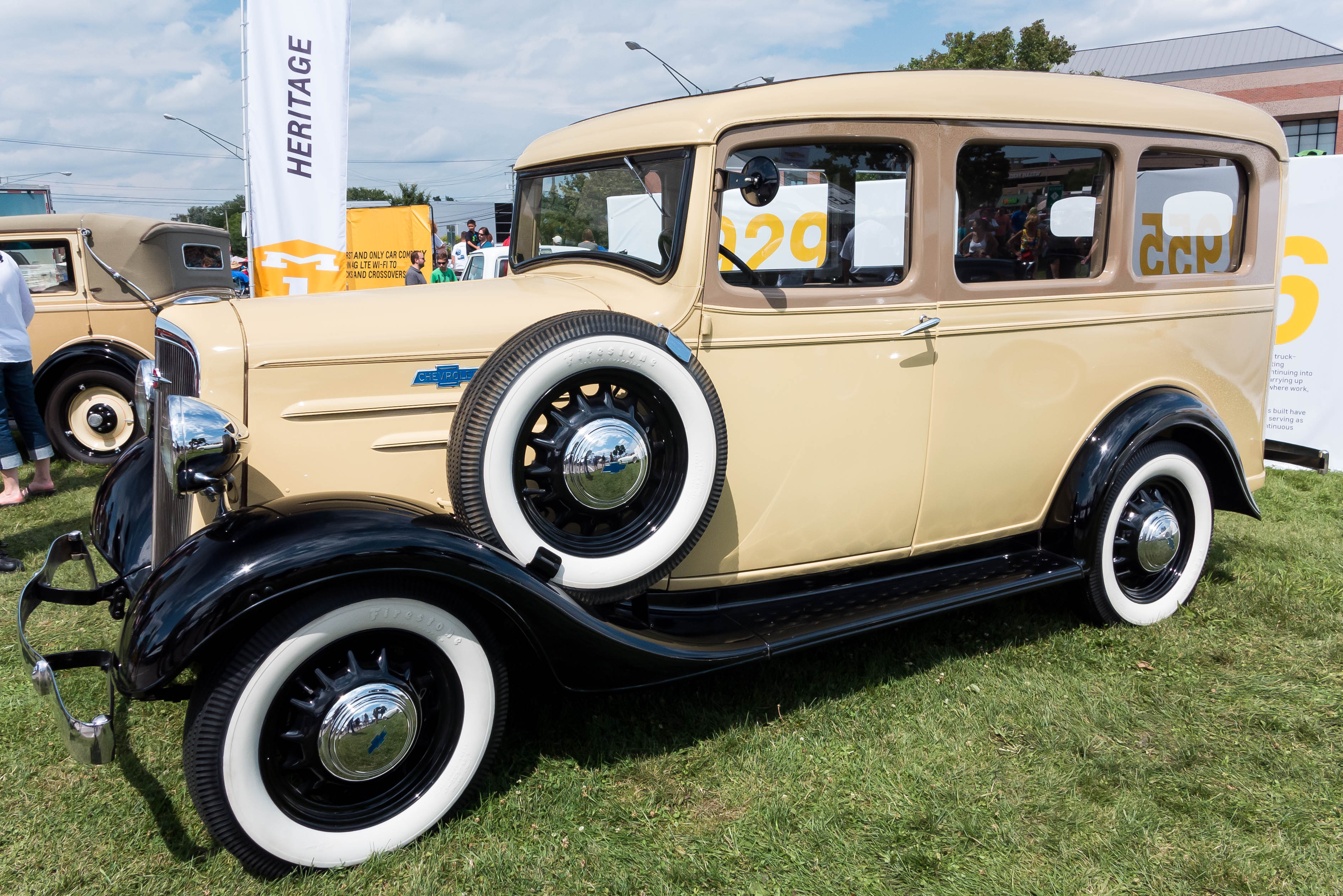
- 1936 Chevrolet Suburban

Overview
- Model years: 1935–1940
- Assembly: Baltimore Assembly, Baltimore, Maryland; Buffalo Assembly, Buffalo, New York; Leeds Assembly, Leeds, Kansas City, Missouri; Oakland Assembly, Oakland, California; North Tarrytown Assembly, Tarrytown, New York; Flint "Chevy in the Hole" Plant, Flint, Michigan; Norwood Assembly, Norwood, Ohio; St. Louis Assembly, St. Louis, Missouri; Oshawa Assembly, Oshawa, Canada

Body and chassis
- Body style: 2-door carryall; 2-door panel truck; 2-door canopy express
- Layout: FR layout
- Related: Chevrolet Master

Powertrain
- Engine: 207 cu in (3.4 L) OHV Chevrolet Stovebolt 6 cylinder

Dimensions
- Wheelbase: 113.5 in (2,883 mm)
- Curb weight: 3,300 lb (1,500 kg)

Prior to the first-generation Suburban, in 1933, the Chevrolet Master had offered a station wagon body built on the 1/2-ton truck frame. This model was specifically built for National Guard and Civilian Conservation Corps units. Much of the body was constructed from wood and could seat up to eight occupants.

The actual first-generation model was offered by Chevrolet as a "Carryall Suburban", a utility vehicle featuring a station wagon body on the chassis of a small truck. Focused on functionality, the concept was indeed to "carry all": the whole family and their gear were to find sufficient space in one truck. It shared the front sheet metal and frames of the half-ton pickup models of the same year, but featured all-metal wagon bodies differing very little in shape from contemporary "woodie" station wagons.

Seating for up to eight occupants was available, with three in the front row, two in the middle row, and three in the rear row. Either the side-hinged rear panel doors or a rear tailgate/lift window could be selected for cargo area access while only having two doors for passenger access.

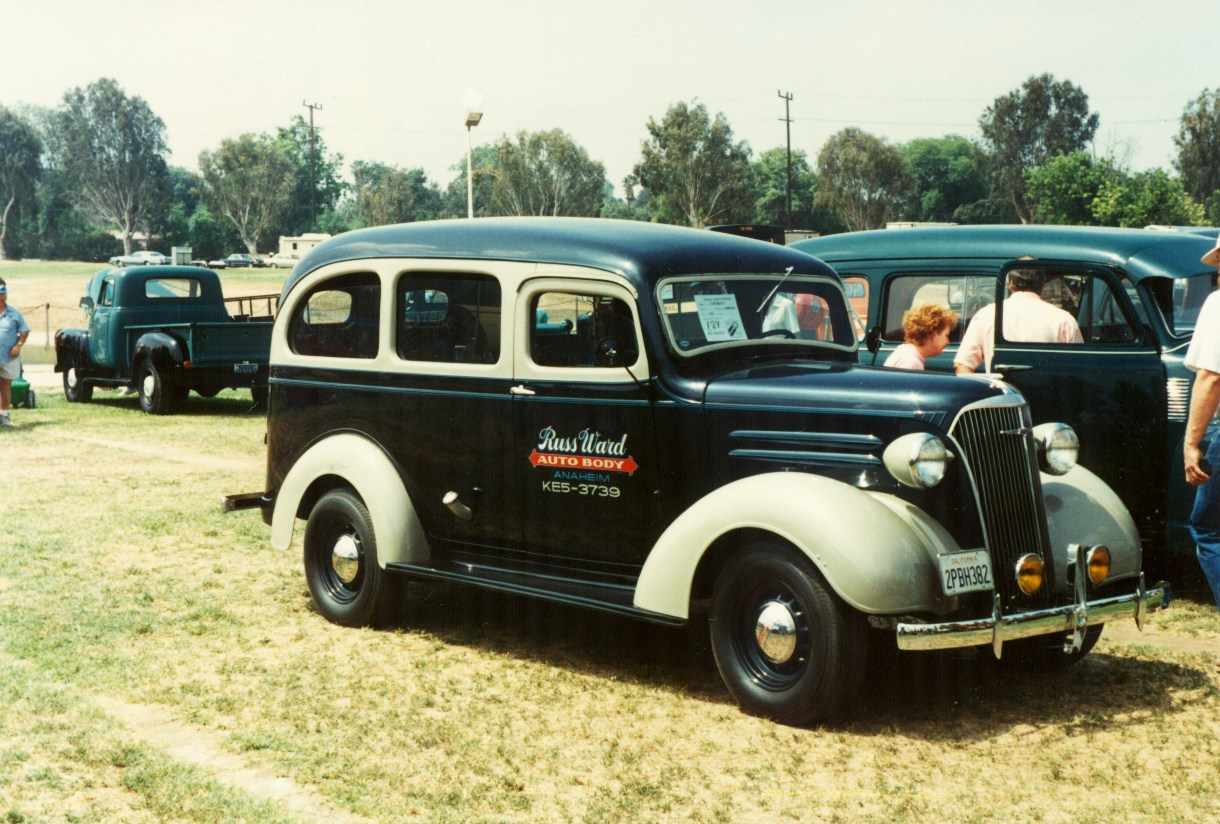
1937 Chevrolet Carryall Suburban

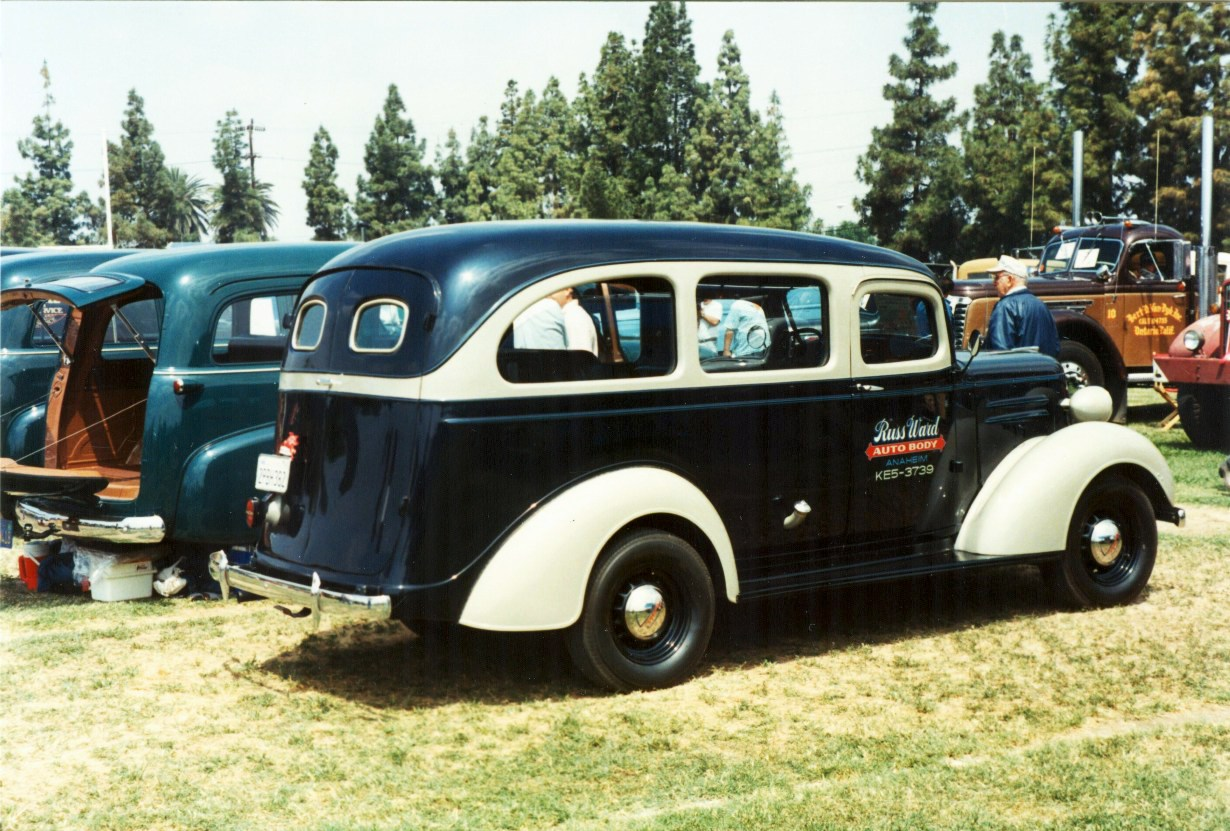
1937 Chevrolet Carryall Suburban (rear)

== Second generation (1941) ==
1941–1942, 1946
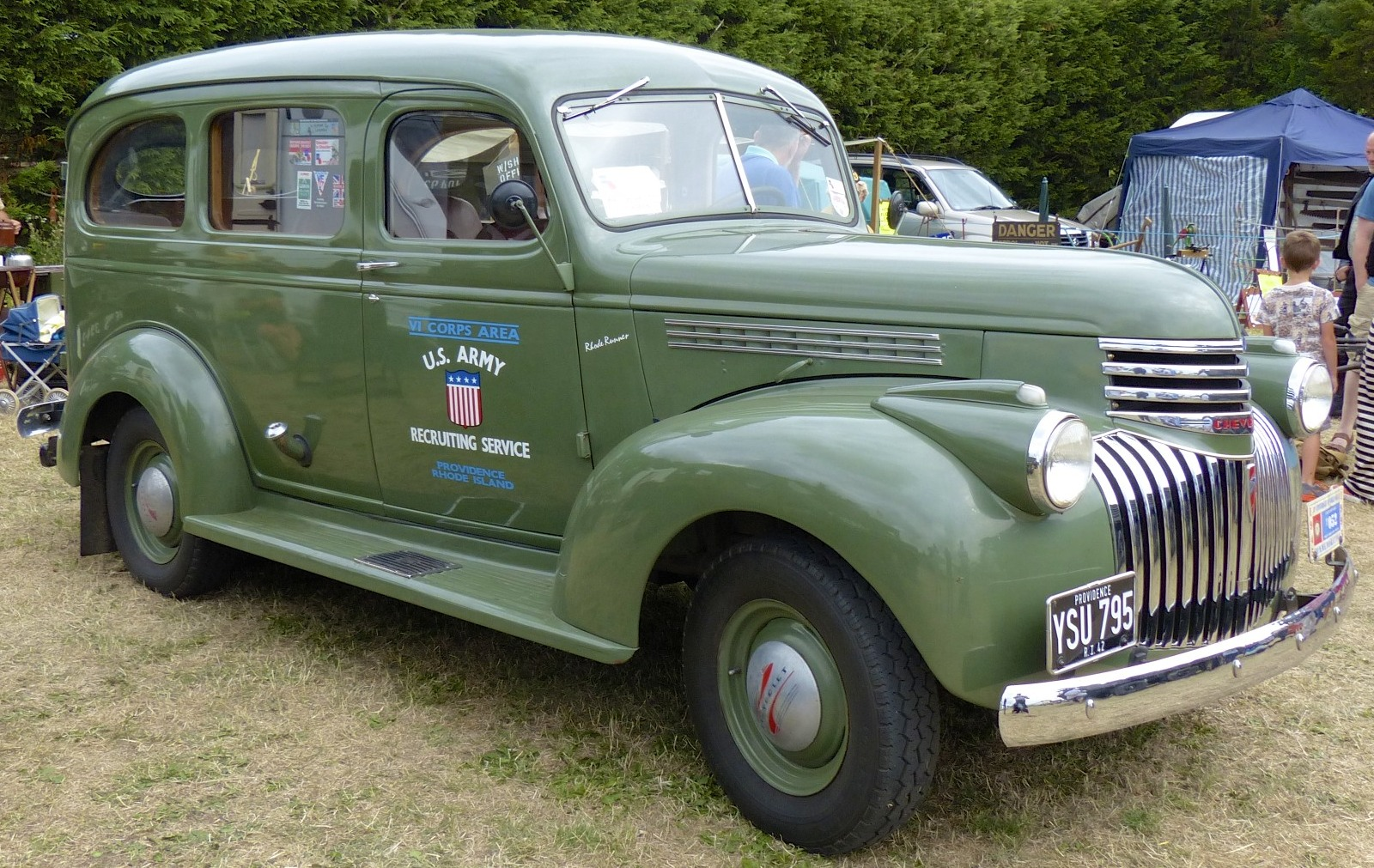
- 1941 Chevrolet Suburban

Overview
- Model years: 1941–1942, 1946
- Assembly: Lakewood Assembly, Lakewood Heights, Atlanta, Georgia; Leeds Assembly, Leeds, Kansas City, Missouri; Oakland Assembly, Oakland, California; St. Louis Assembly, St. Louis, Missouri; Flint "Chevy in the Hole" Plant, Flint, Michigan; Norwood Assembly, Norwood, Ohio; North Tarrytown Assembly, Tarrytown, New York; Oshawa Assembly, Oshawa, Canada

Body and chassis
- Body style: 2-door carryall; 2-door panel truck; 2-door canopy express
- Layout: FR layout
- Platform: AK Series

Powertrain
- Engine: 216 cu in (3.5 L) I6; 228 cu in (3.7 L) I6
- Transmission: 3-speed manual

Dimensions
- Wheelbase: 116 in (2,946 mm)
- Length: 196.625 in (4,994 mm)

Suburbans were built in the model years 1941, 1942, and 1946. They were also produced during World War II as a military transport vehicle. Seating for up to eight occupants was available. Models with rear panel doors were designated "3106", while those with tailgates were designated "3116". The Chevrolet versions were equipped a 216-cubic-inch six-cylinder engine. The GMC version was equipped with a 228-cubic-inch 6-cylinder engine. It shared much of its mechanicals with the AK Series trucks.

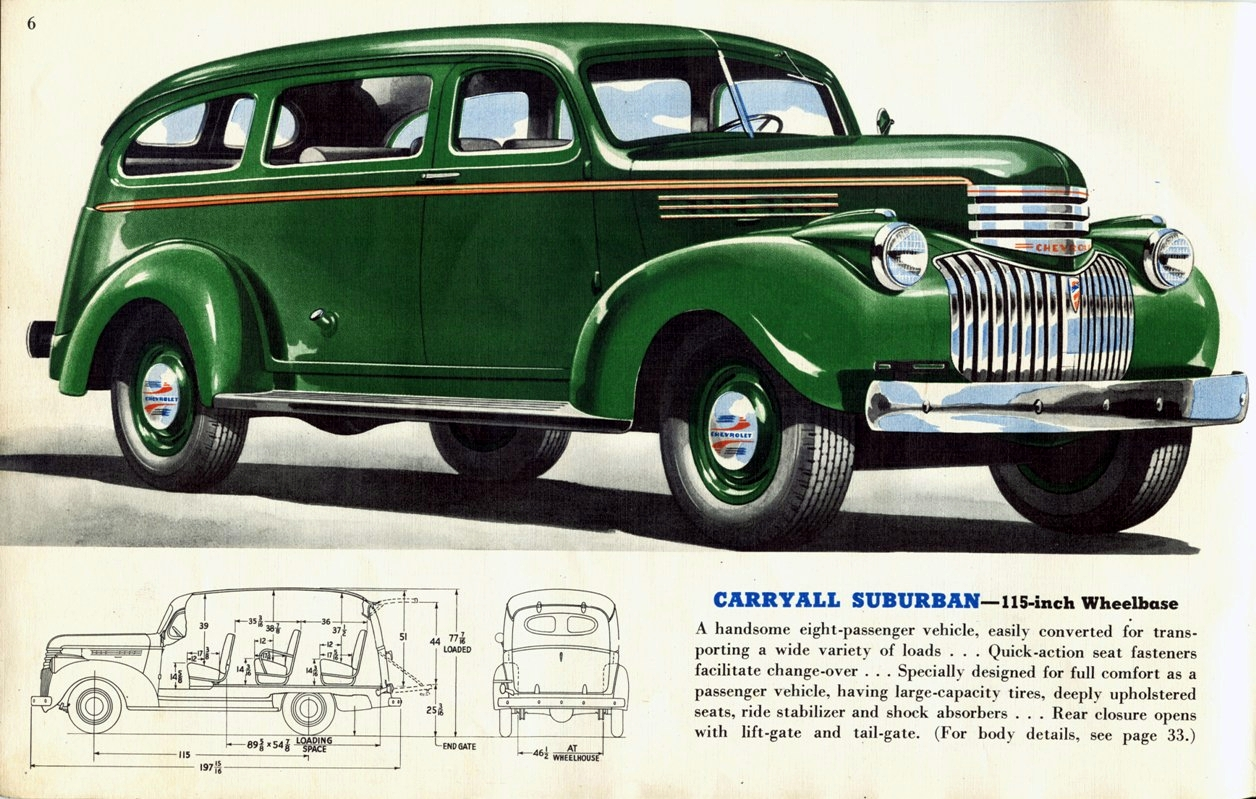
1941 Chevrolet Carryall Suburban advert

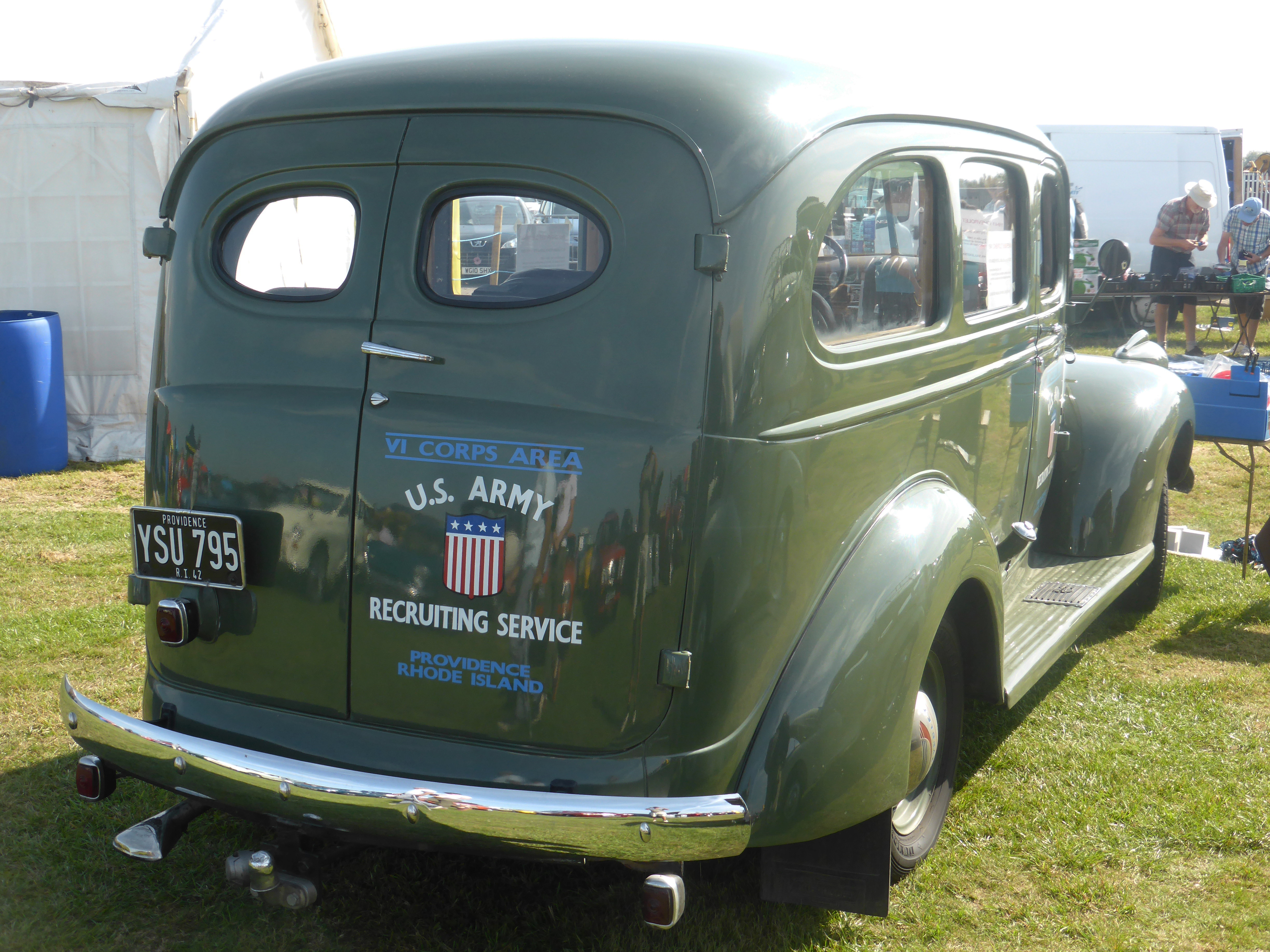
1941 Chevrolet Suburban rear 3/4 view

== Third generation (1947) ==
1947–1955
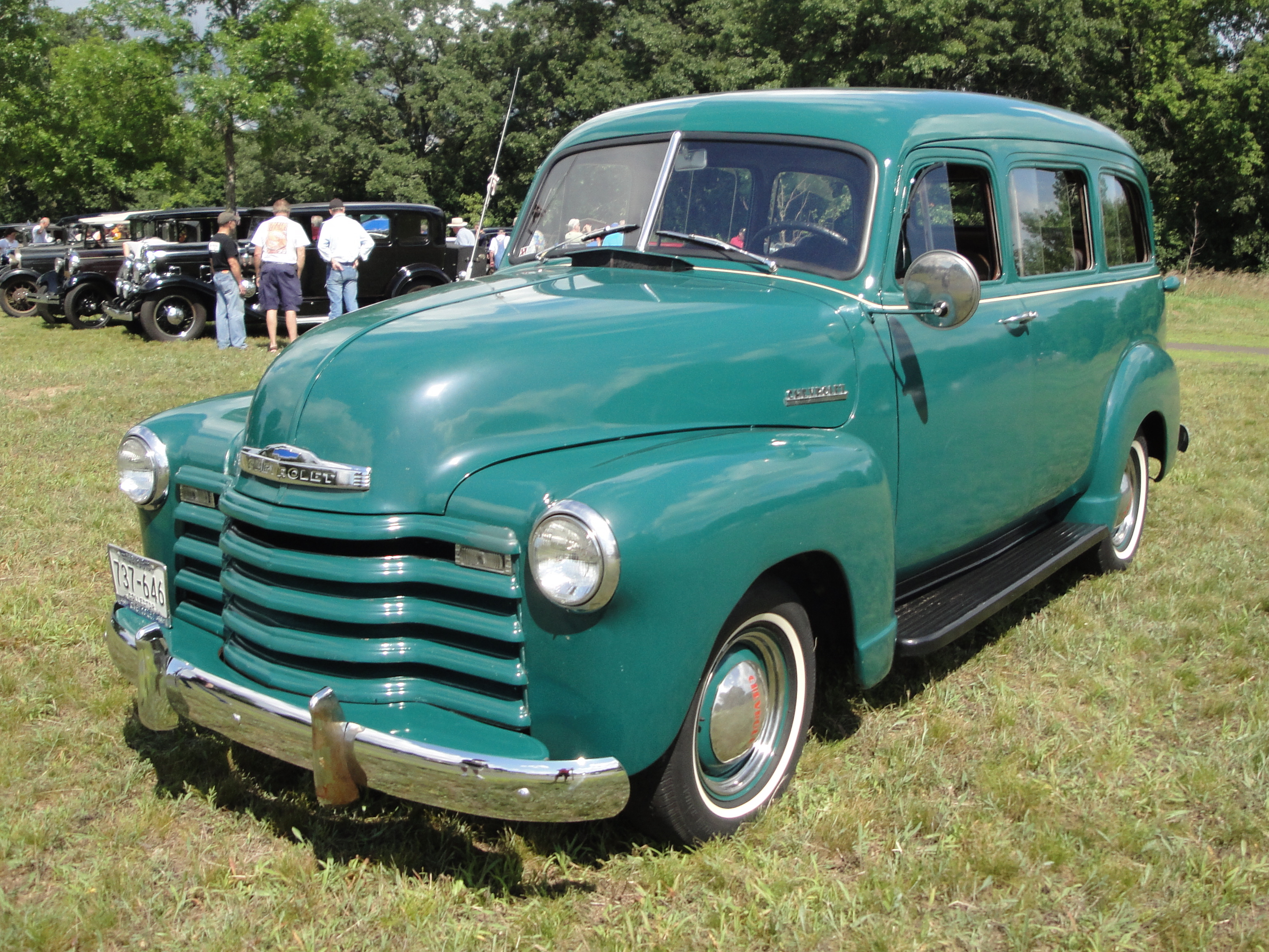
- 1952 Chevrolet Suburban

Overview
- Model years: 1947–1955 (First Series)
- Assembly: Baltimore Assembly, Baltimore, Maryland; Janesville Assembly, Janesville, Wisconsin; Leeds Assembly, Leeds, Kansas City, Missouri; Norwood Assembly, Norwood, Ohio; Oakland Assembly, Oakland, California (Chevrolet & GMC); Pontiac, Michigan (GMC only); St. Louis Truck Assembly, St. Louis, Missouri (Chevrolet & GMC); North Tarrytown Assembly, North Tarrytown, New York; Van Nuys Assembly (Van Nuys, California)

Body and chassis
- Body style: 2-door carryall; 2-door panel truck; 2-door canopy express
- Layout: FR layout
- Platform: Advance Design

Powertrain
- Engine: 216 cu in (3.5 L) "Stovebolt" OHV I6; 235 cu in (3.9 L) "Thriftmaster" I6 after 1954
- Transmission: 3 speed manual; 4 speed manual, 4 speed Hydra-Matic automatic

Dimensions
- Wheelbase: 116 in (2,946 mm)
- Length: 196.375 in (4,988 mm)

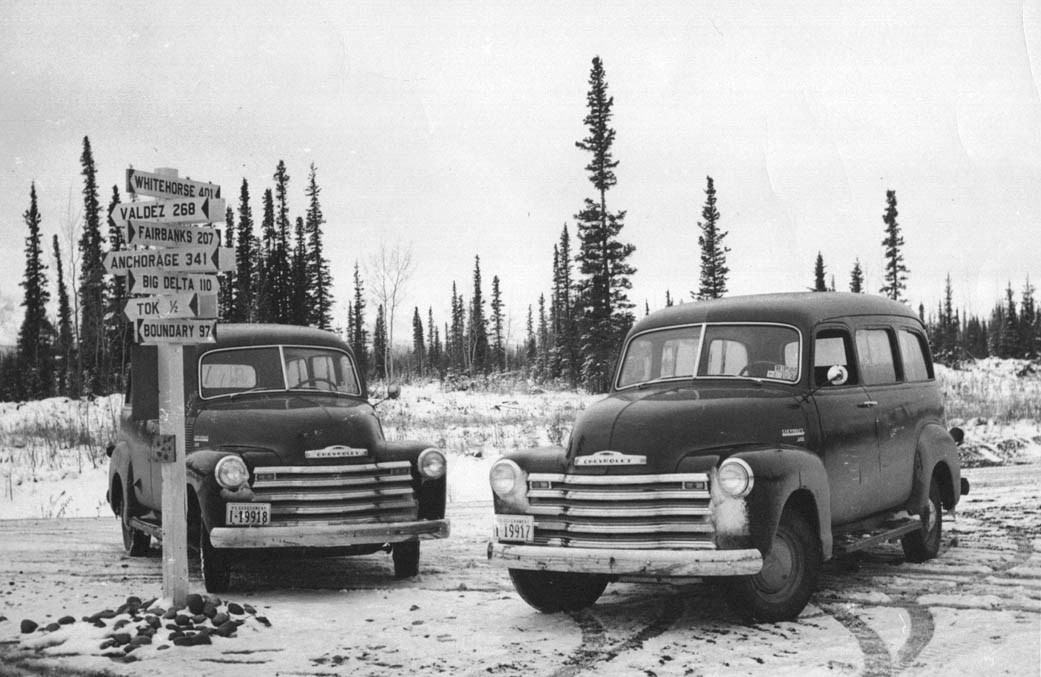
1950 Chevrolet Suburbans

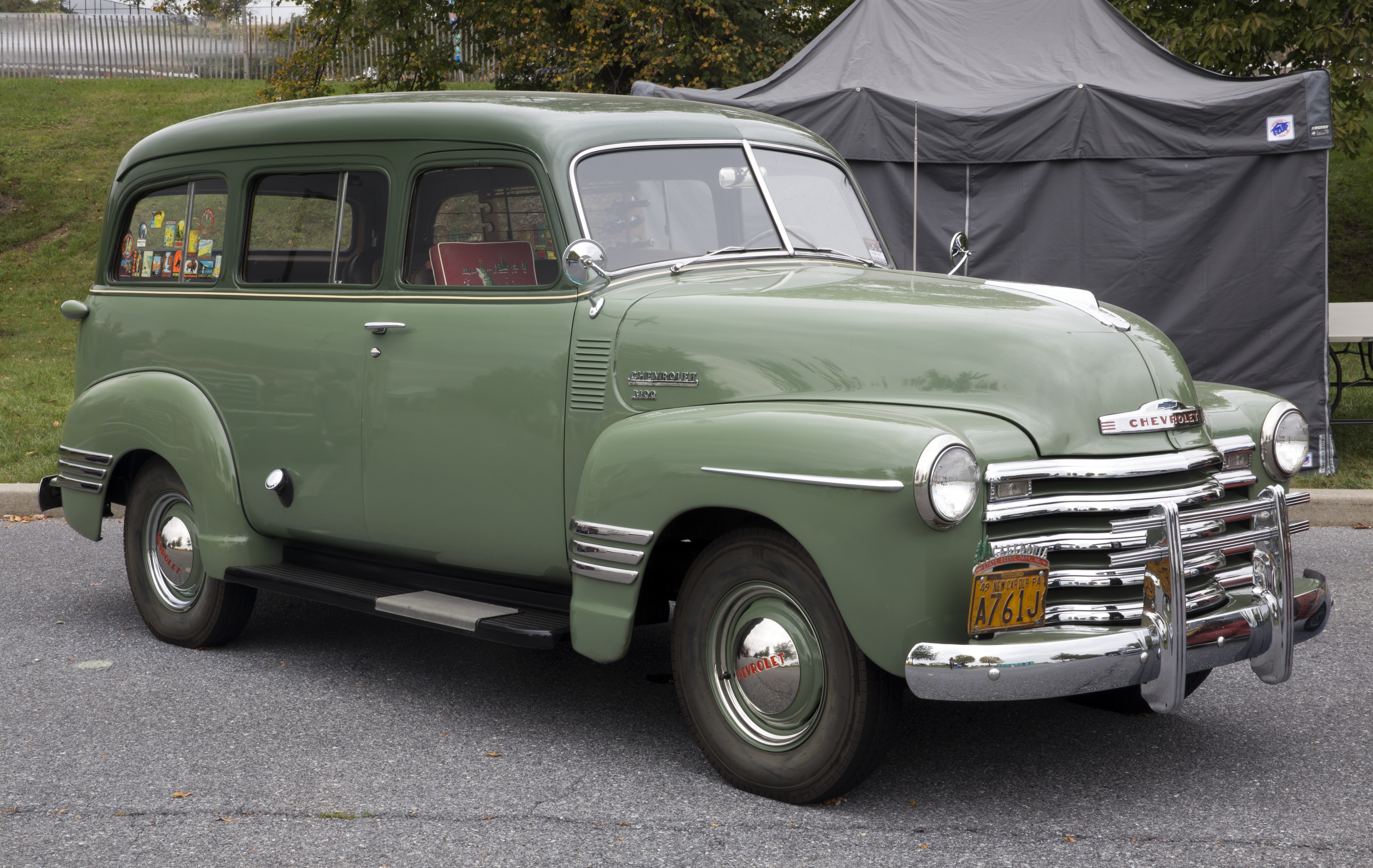
1949 Chevrolet 3100 Suburban

The third generation model was based on the Chevrolet Advance Design series of pickups.

Beginning in 1953, the Hydra-Matic four-speed automatic transmission was available in GMC models and in the 1954 model year Chevrolet Suburbans. Models with rear panel doors were designated "3106", while those with tailgates were designated "3116". In 1952, the Suburban came with either a tailgate or panel doors. The front bench seat was split, with two seats on the driver's side and a single seat on the passenger side, which slid forward for access to the rear two rows of seats. The second row was a "2/3" seat, requiring occupants to move past the front passenger seat, as well as the second-row seats to access the third row. This was the last series to feature "canopy express" models.

The design of the 1947 Suburban would inspire the design of the Chevrolet HHR over half a century later.

== Fourth generation (1955) ==
1955–1959
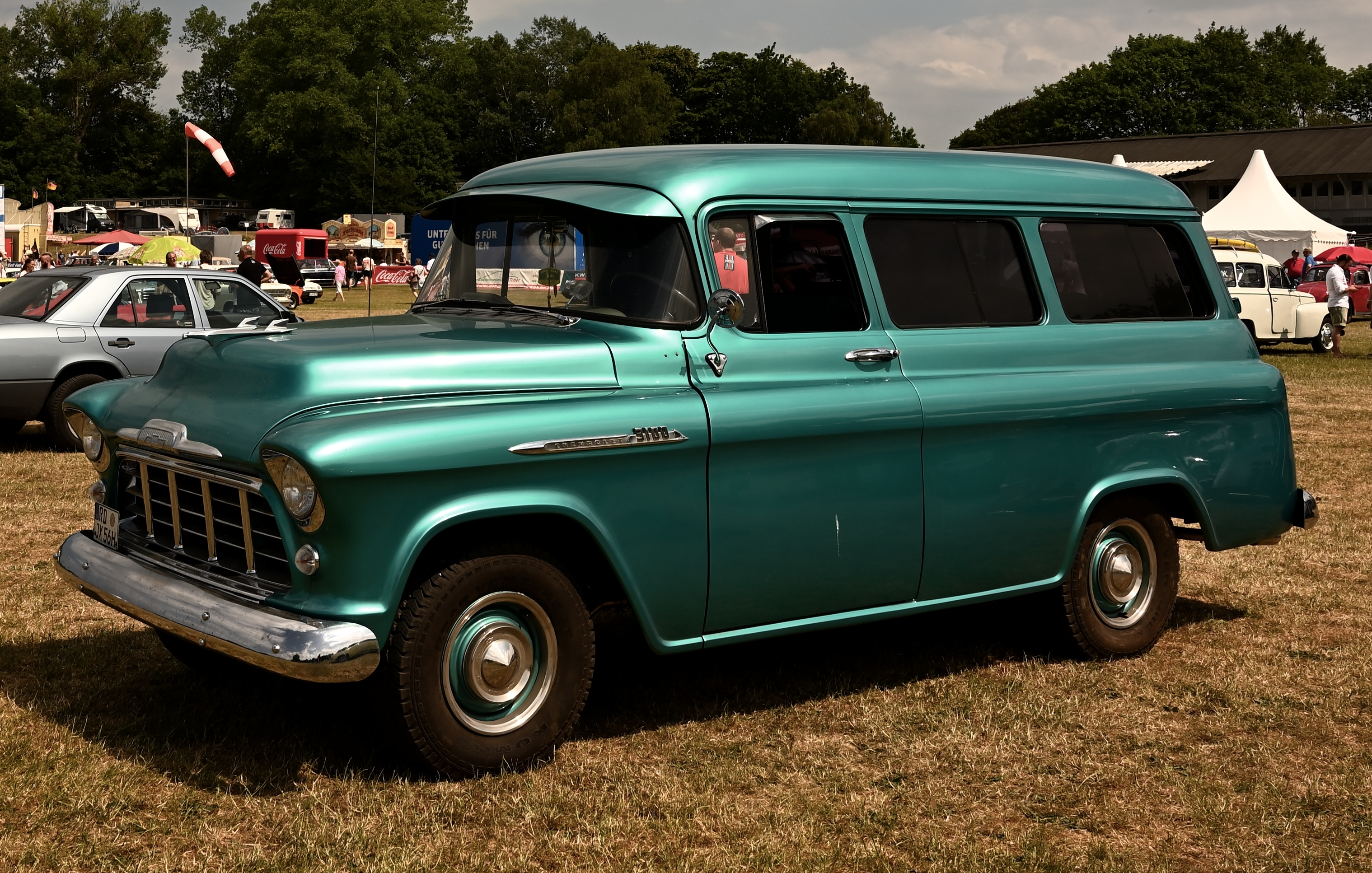
- 1955-1959 Chevrolet Suburban

Overview
- Model years: 1955 (Second Series)–1959
- Assembly: Baltimore Assembly, Baltimore, Maryland; Janesville Assembly, Janesville, Wisconsin; Lakewood Assembly, Lakewood Heights, Atlanta, Georgia; Leeds Assembly, Leeds, Kansas City, Missouri; Norwood Assembly, Norwood, Ohio; Oakland Assembly, Oakland, California (Chevrolet & GMC); Pontiac, Michigan (GMC only); Van Nuys Assembly, (Van Nuys, California); Willow Run Assembly, Ypsilanti, Michigan (1958–1959)

Body and chassis
- Body style: 2-door carryall; 2-door panel truck
- Layout: Front engine, rear-wheel drive / four-wheel drive
- Platform: Task Force

Powertrain
- Engine: 265 cu in (4.3 L) 145 hp (108 kW) V8; 283 cu in (4.6 L) 155 hp (116 kW) V8
- Transmission: 3-speed manual, 4-speed manual, 4-speed Hydra-Matic automatic

Dimensions
- Wheelbase: 114 in (2,896 mm)

Updated engineering and styling on Chevrolet trucks was not introduced until March 25, 1955, in the middle of the model year that GM called the Chevrolet Task Force/GMC Blue Chip series. All Chevrolet and GMC truck models received new styling that included a flatter hood, front fenders flush with the body, and a trapezoid grille. The trucks' V-shaped speedometer was shared with passenger car models.

Engines included I6 and the small-block V8s. Chevrolet used its 265 V8 engine, later evolving it to a 283-cubic-inch version. GMC based their V8 on a Pontiac design. Standard Suburban model numbers continued from the previous series, but the introduction of four-wheel-drive models in 1957 added the numbers "3156" for 4WD Suburbans with panel doors, and "3166" for 4WD Suburbans with tailgates.

The "Suburban" name was also used on GM's two-door GMC 100 series pickup trucks from 1955 to 1959, called the Suburban Pickup, which was similar to the Chevrolet Cameo Carrier. However, it was dropped at the same time as Chevy's Cameo in March 1958, when GM released the new all-steel "Fleetside" bed option, replacing the Cameo/Suburban Pickup fiberglass bedsides. The Suburban name was never used again on a 1/2 ton pickup after the discontinuation of the Suburban Pickup. Although not documented because of a fire that destroyed the records, the production of Suburban Pickups is understood to be 300 or fewer each model year it was offered from 1955 to 1958.

== Fifth generation (1960) ==
1960–1966
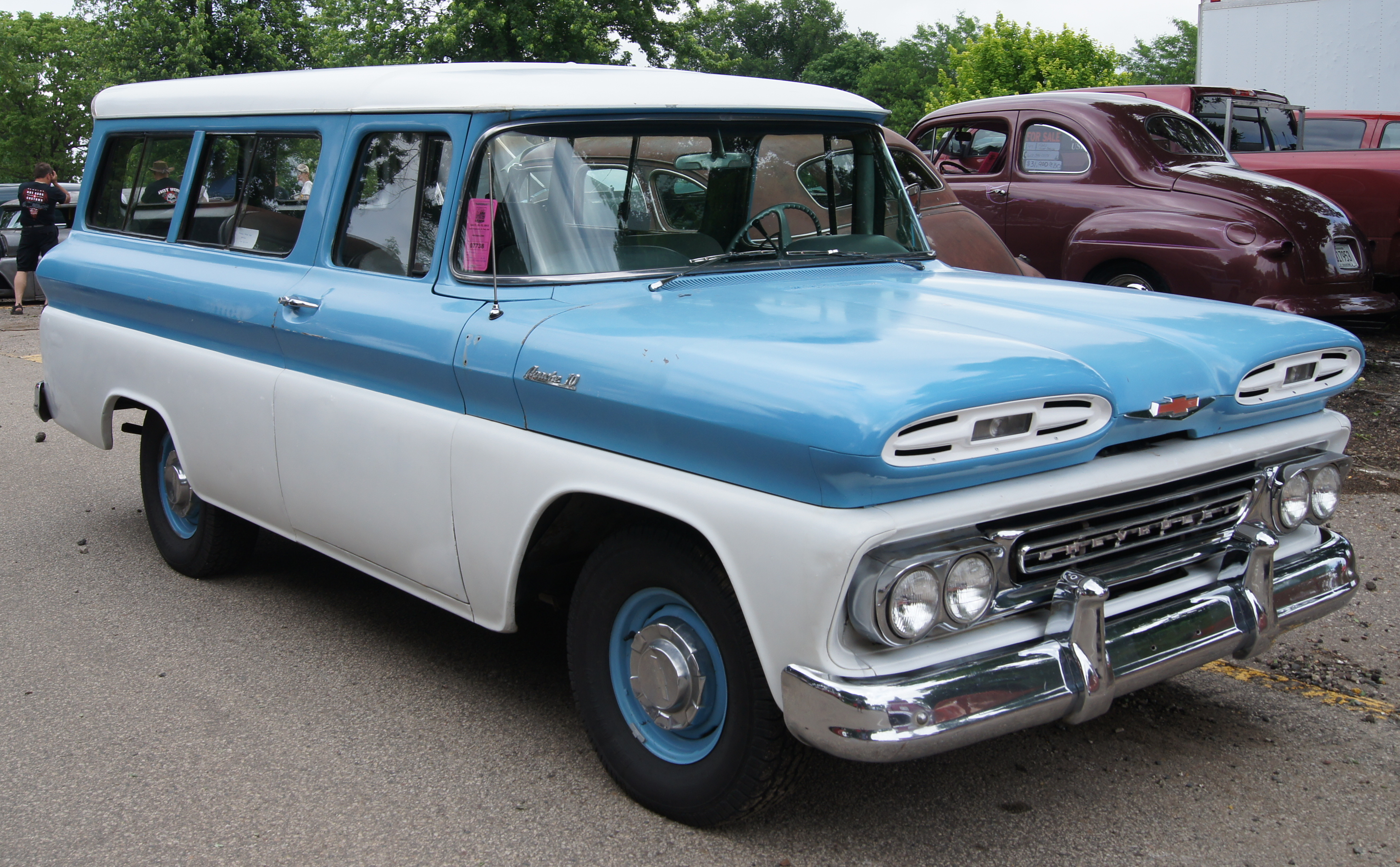
- 1961 Chevrolet Apache Suburban

Overview
- Also called: GMC Carryall; Chevrolet Veraneio (Brazil)
- Model years: 1960–1966; 1964–1989 (Veraneio)
- Assembly: Baltimore Assembly, Baltimore, Maryland; Flint Truck Assembly, Flint, Michigan; Fremont Assembly, Fremont, California (Chevrolet & GMC, 1963–1966); Janesville Assembly, Janesville, Wisconsin; Lakewood Assembly, Lakewood Heights, Atlanta, Georgia; Leeds Assembly, Leeds, Kansas City, Missouri; Oakland Assembly, Oakland, California (Chevrolet & GMC, 1960–1964); Pontiac West Assembly, Pontiac, Michigan (GMC only); St. Louis Truck Assembly, St. Louis, Missouri; North Tarrytown Assembly, North Tarrytown, New York; São Caetano do Sul, Brazil (Chevrolet Veraneio)

Body and chassis
- Body style: 2-door SUV; 5-door SUV (Veraneio); 2-door panel truck
- Layout: Front engine, rear-wheel drive / four-wheel drive
- Platform: C/K series

Powertrain
- Engine: 230 cu in (3.8 L) I6 (63–65); 235 cu in (3.9 L) I6 (60–62); 250 cu in (4.1 L) I6 (66); 283 cu in (4.6 L) V8 (60–66); 292 cu in (4.8 L) I6 (63–66); 305 cu in (5.0 L) V6; 327 cu in (5.4 L) V8 (66)
- Transmission: 3-speed synchromesh manual, 4-speed synchromesh, 4-speed Hydra-Matic automatic, Powerglide

Dimensions
- Wheelbase: 115 in (2,921 mm)
- Length: 199.5 in (5,067 mm)
- Width: 79.5 in (2,019 mm)

The styling of the 1960–1961 model year took cues from the late 1950s Chevrolet vehicles, and had large oval ports above the grille. An independent front suspension was new for 1960. The cab featured a "wrap around" windshield, while tailgate and panel door rear openings were available.

From 1962 onwards, the hood styling was more conservative, with hoods that eliminated the large ports. In 1964, the front glass area was updated to a flatter windshield and larger door glass. 1,150 lb (520 kg) of cargo could be carried in the back.

This model series introduced a factory-equipped 4WD ("K") option for the first time. The 2WD ("C") models introduced a torsion bar-based independent front suspension and trailing arm and coil spring rear, but returned to a more conventional coil-spring approach by 1963.

Engine options included straight-sixes and small-block V8s. A 305 cu in (5.0 L) GMC V6 engine was also available on GMC models. This 305 was actually from GMC's medium-duty truck line. It featured high torque but had notoriously poor fuel economy. Transmissions were a three-speed and four-speed manual, the automatic Powerglide, and in the GMC models, the dual-range Hydra-Matic from 1960 to 1962.

A 15-passenger conversion was done by Stageway of Fort Smith, Arkansas. These modified Suburbans had three doors on the right, a 171 in (4,343 mm) wheelbase, were 273 in (6,934 mm) long, and weighed 6,300 lb (2,858 kg).

One-ton (C-30), 10-foot (3 m) panel truck models were no longer available after 1966.

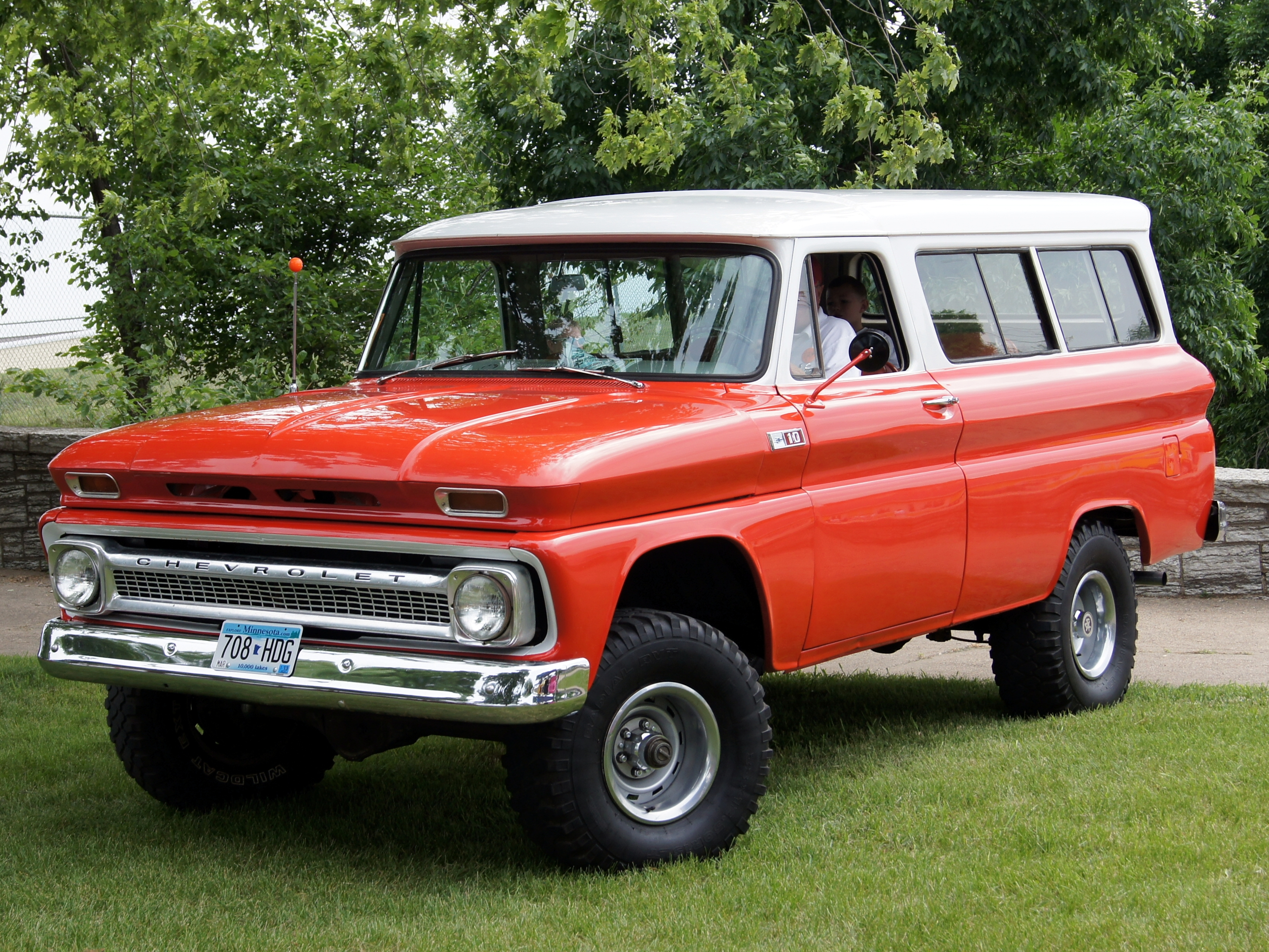
1964 Chevy Suburban Carryall

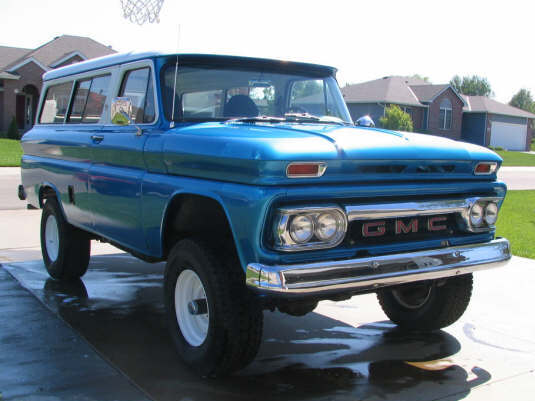
1966 GMC Suburban

=== Chevrolet Veraneio (Brazil) ===
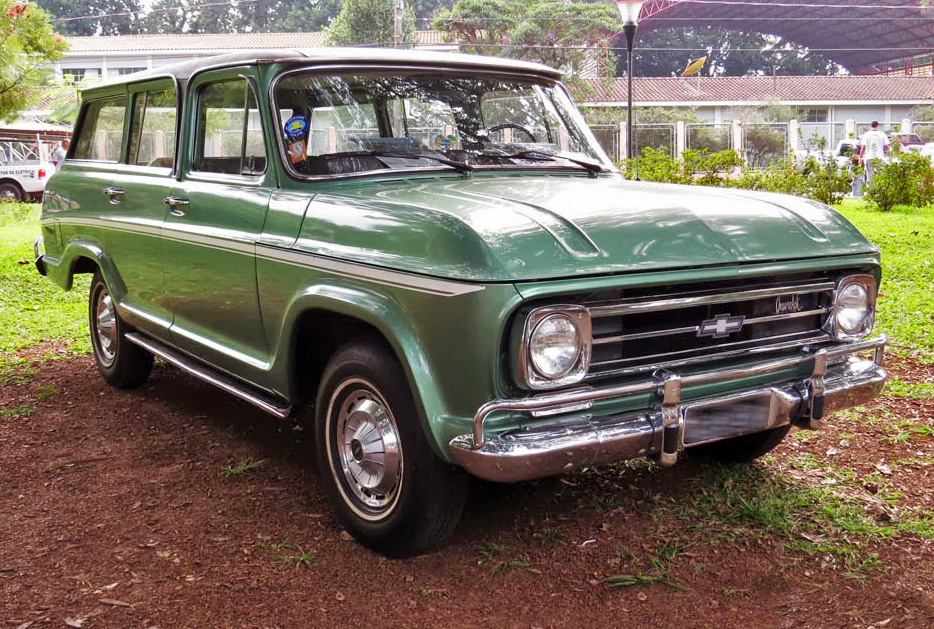
1972–1978 Chevrolet Veraneio

In 1964, Chevrolet in Brazil introduced a five-door version of the Suburban, known as the C-1416 (known as Veraneio from 1969 onwards, which is Portuguese for "summertime"). It was based on the contemporary Brazilian Chevrolet C-14. Like the C-14, the C-1416/Veraneio used the instrument cluster from the U.S. C/K series, although the exterior sheet metal layout is exclusive to Brazil. It was initially powered with a Chevrolet 4.3L inline-six based on the pre-1962 "Stovebolt" engines. Later, it used the 250 cu in (4.1 L) engine from Chevrolet's Brazilian mid-size sedan, the Opala. The original version of the Veraneio was kept in production, with another grille and interior, until the 1989 model year, but it was eventually replaced with an updated version based on the Série 20 family. The second generation of Veraneio was produced from 1989 to 1995.

In 1997, GM introduced the then-current North American pickups to the Brazilian market, replacing the long-running C-series. The Brazilian version of the Suburban was also converted to the current generation at the time, and lasted until 2001 as the "Grand Blazer", succeeding the Veraneio. The 4.1L inline-six engine with 138 hp (101 kW) was offered on both models with option for a MWM 4.2L turbodiesel unit with 168 hp (124 kW).

In 2015, Autoweek ranked the Veraneio fourth among Chevrolet station wagons never sold in the U.S. It also cited the vehicle's design as "baroque" and summed it up as "a 1960s Brazilian crossover." Autoweek noted that the Veraneio was eligible for import to the United States under the 25-year exemption.

== Sixth generation (1967) ==
1967–1972
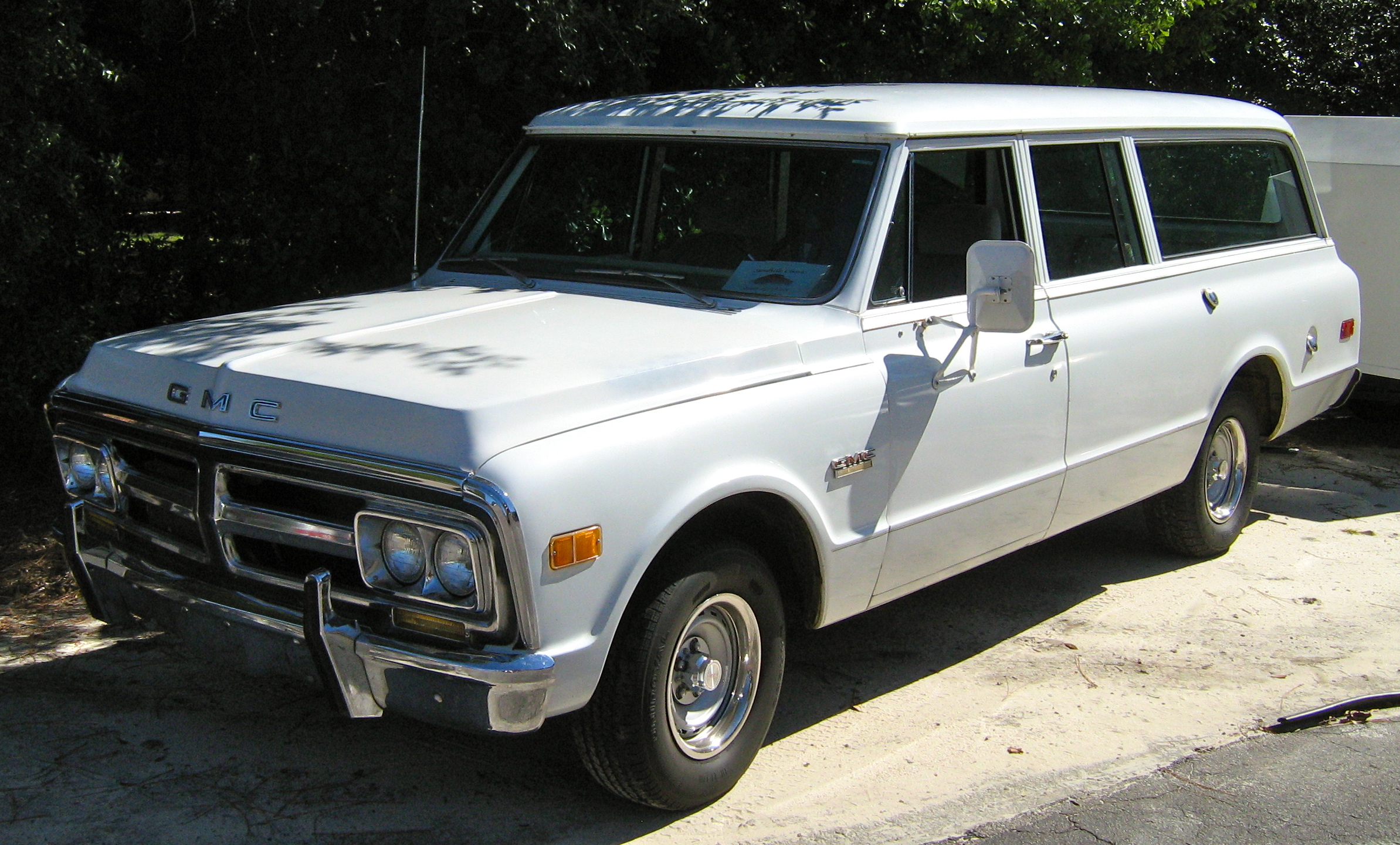
- 1968-1972 GMC Suburban

Overview
- Also called: GMC Carryall
- Model years: 1967–1972
- Assembly: Flint Truck Assembly, Flint, Michigan; Fremont Assembly, Fremont, California; St. Louis Truck Assembly, St. Louis, Missouri; Oshawa Truck Assembly, Oshawa, Ontario, Canada

Body and chassis
- Body style: 3-door station wagon (North America); 2-door panel truck
- Layout: Front engine, rear-wheel drive / four-wheel drive
- Platform: C/K series

Powertrain
- Engine: 305 cu in (5.0 L) GMC V6; 250 cu in (4.1 L) Chevrolet I6; 292 cu in (4.8 L) Chevrolet I6; 283 cu in (4.6 L) Chevy small-block V8; 307 cu in (5.0 L) Chevy small-block V8; 327 cu in (5.4 L) Chevy small-block V8; 350 cu in (5.7 L) Chevy small-block V8; 396 cu in (6.5 L) Chevy big-block V8; 402 cu in (6.6 L) Chevy big-block V8
- Transmission: 3-speed manual, 4-speed manual, Powerglide, Turbo-Hydramatic

Dimensions
- Wheelbase: 127 in (3,226 mm)
- Length: 215.5 in (5,474 mm)

Chronology
- Successor: Chevrolet Van (for panel truck models)

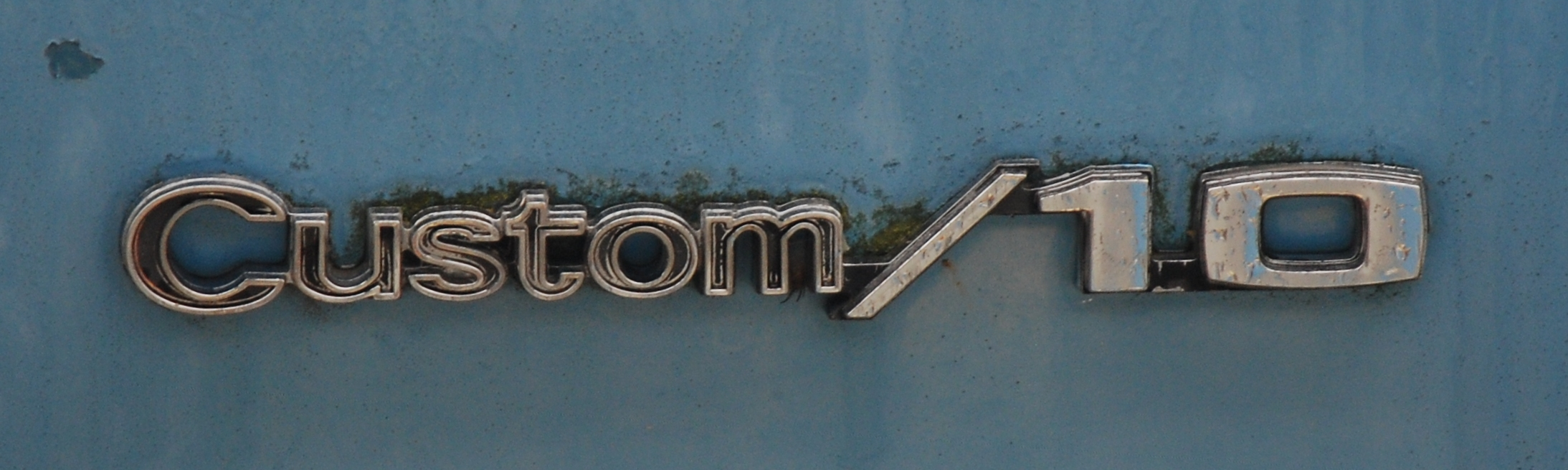
Chevrolet Suburban C10 badge

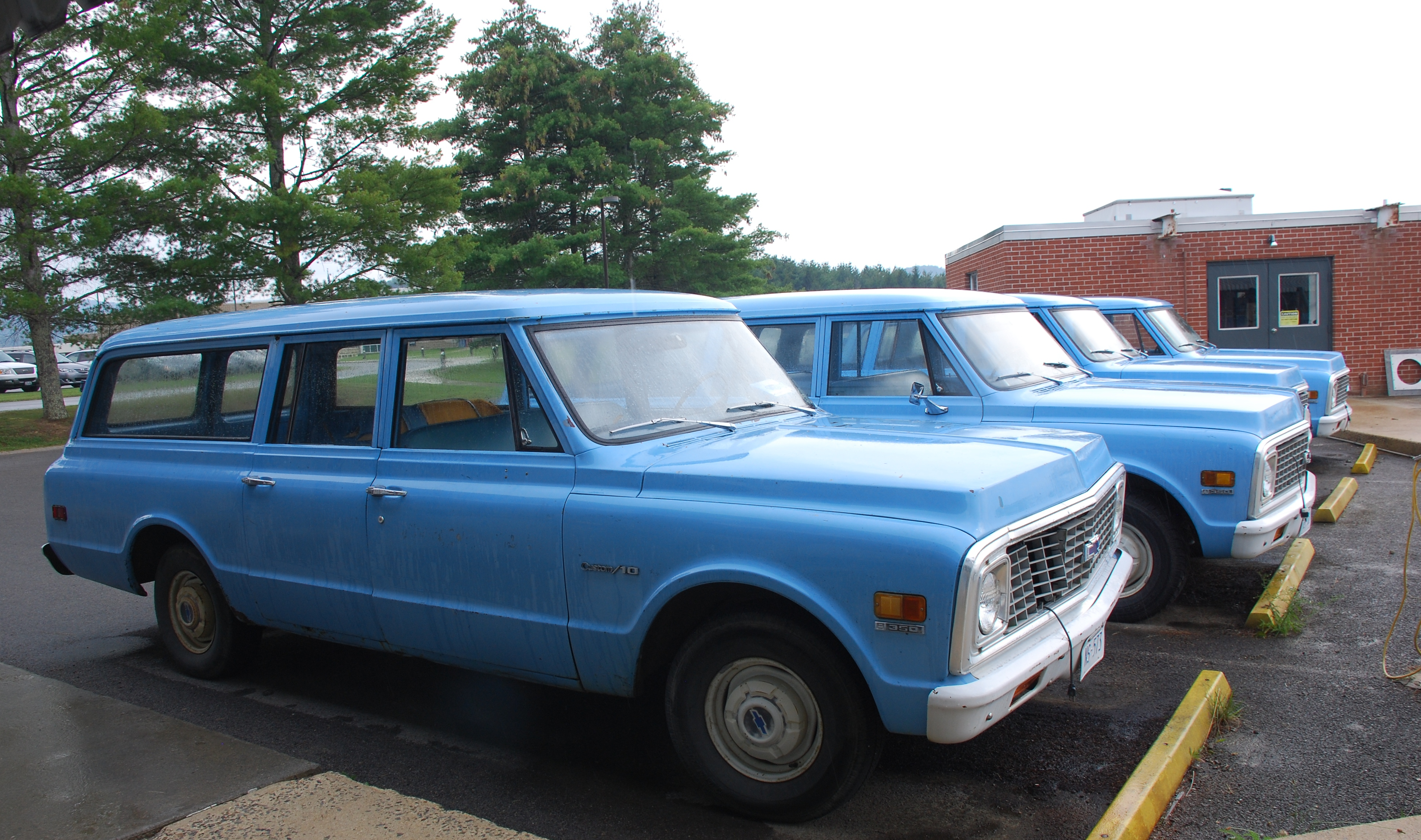
Chevrolet Suburban C10

For 1967, the sixth-generation Suburban debuted as part of the "Action-Line" generation of C/K trucks. Growing in size over its rival, the International Travelall, the Suburban moved from a 115-inch to a 127-inch wheelbase (shared by pickup trucks with eight-foot beds). In another change, a 3/4-ton C-20 Suburban was introduced for the first time. Alongside the standard rear-wheel-drive configuration, 4×4 K-10/K-20 models were also offered.

In a configuration distinct to this generation, Action-Line Suburbans moved to three passenger doors: a single driver-side door and two passenger-side door. For 1969, the Suburban wagon was joined by the shorter K5 Blazer (GMC Jimmy), a two-door utility vehicle with a lift-off hardtop. The rear-wheel-drive Suburban was also available as a two-door panel truck for commercial purposes. Following the 1970 model year, the panel truck was retired, as GM functionally replaced the model with the G-Series Chevrolet Van/GMC Vandura for 1971.

Through its production, the Action-Line Suburban shared a large amount of mechanical commonality with its pickup-truck counterpart. In addition to its standard 250-cubic-inch inline-6, a 292-cubic-inch inline-6 offered as an option. Initially offered with 283 and 327 cubic-inch small-block V8, 307 and 350 V8s were introduced as options; a 402 V8 (marketed as a 396 V8) served as a large-block V8 offering. Until 1970, GMC offered the Suburban with a standard 305 cubic-inch V6.

Sharing the model updates of the Action-Line pickup trucks, the Suburban introduced front disc brakes for 1971; automatic-transmission vehicles received an optional tilting steering column. For 1972, the optional rear-seat air conditioning was redesigned with a smaller housing (previously fitted with a housing that ran the full length of the roof).

The Action-Line Suburban was produced alongside the rapid growth of the recreational vehicle market in the late 1960s. While only about 6,200 Suburbans were produced for 1967, by 1972, production had grown to approximately 27,000. Alongside the retirement of the panel truck configuration, this generation marked the final use of the GMC Carryall name.

== Seventh generation (1973) ==
1973–1991
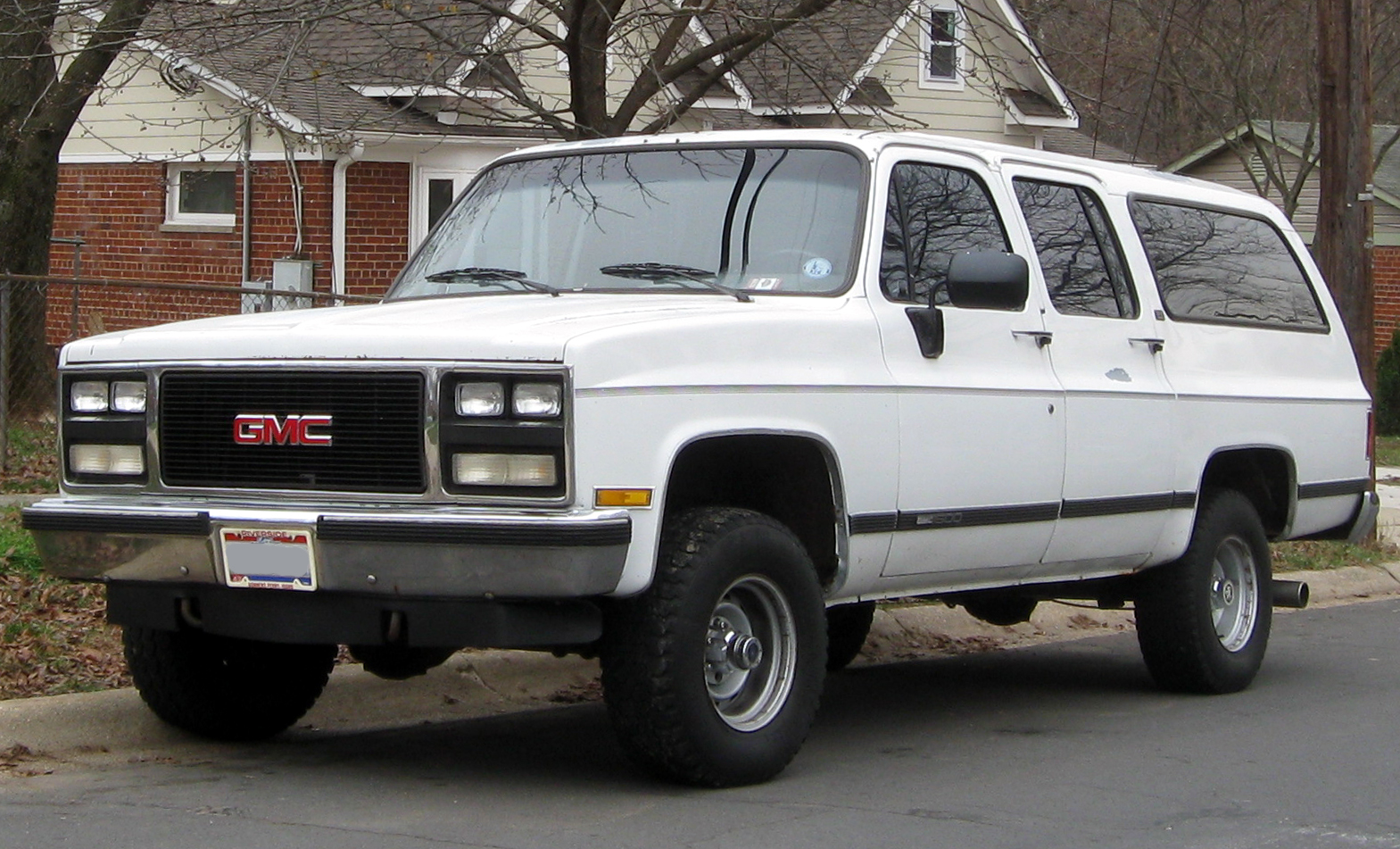
- 1989-1991 GMC Suburban V-1500 Series

Overview
- Also called: GMC Suburban
- Model years: 1973–1991
- Assembly: Flint, Michigan (Flint Truck Assembly)

Body and chassis
- Body style: 4-door SUV
- Layout: Front engine, rear-wheel drive / four-wheel drive
- Platform: C/K series
- Related: Chevrolet K-Blazer/GMC K-Jimmy; Chevrolet/GMC C/K; Chevrolet Veraneio (Brazil)

Powertrain
- Engine: Gasoline: 250 cu in (4.1 L) I6; 305 cu in (5.0 L) V8 (1976–88); 307 cu in (5.0 L) V8 (1973); 350 cu in (5.7 L) V8; 400 cu in (6.6 L) V8 (1976–80); 454 cu in (7.4 L) V8; Diesel: 379 cu in (6.2 L) Detroit Diesel V8 (1982–91)
- Transmission: Manual: 3-speed; 4-speed; Automatic: 3-speed THM-350; 3-speed THM-400; 4-speed 700R4 (1981–91); 4-speed 4L80-E (1991)

Dimensions
- Wheelbase: 129.5 in (3,289 mm)
- Length: 219.1 in (5,565 mm)
- Width: 79.6 in (2,022 mm)
- Height: R10: 72.0 in (1,829 mm); V10: 73.8 in (1,875 mm); R20: 74.3 in (1,887 mm); V20: 76.1 in (1,933 mm)
- Curb weight: 5,837 lb (2,648 kg)

For 1973, the Suburban became part of the Rounded-Line C/K series, with both the Chevrolet and GMC divisions adopting the Suburban nameplate. Growing nominally in size over its Action-Line predecessor, the seventh-generation Suburban completely abandoned its carryall past, introducing a station wagon–style body with four full passenger doors (more than a decade after its rivals, the Jeep Wagoneer and International Travelall). As the term "sport-utility vehicle" was more closely associated with off-road vehicles (such as the K5 Blazer), GM designated the Suburban as a truck-based station wagon.

From the rear of the passenger doors, the Suburban shared its bodywork (both its doors and roofline) with the C/K crew-cab pickup (a new configuration introduced for 1973). The 1/2-ton and 3/4-ton 10 and 20 payload series made their return alongside the rear-wheel-drive C-series and 4×4 K-series. Alongside the long-running twin-panel rear doors, the Suburban adopted an optional tailgate-style rear door with a retractable rear window (lowered manually or electrically).

Initially offered in Custom, Custom Deluxe, and Cheyenne Super trims, the Suburban adopted a base Custom Deluxe, mid-level Scottsdale, and flagship Silverado trim nomenclature for 1975. GMC Suburbans were initially Custom, Super Custom, and Sierra Grande; in 1975, Sierra Classic replaced Super Custom. In 1981, GMC replaced Custom with Sierra. A rare variant for both Chevrolet and GMC was the Estate option package, offering woodgrain exterior trim (in line with sedan-based wagons); the option was offered through the 1979 model year.

Though technically fitted with only a front bench seat as standard equipment, the Suburban was offered in multiple interior configurations, offering up to nine-passenger seating. Bucket front seats became a front-seat option in 1978, with the third-row seat changed to a quick-release design (without tools) for 1979.

The Rounded-Line Suburban shared the same exterior revisions of its pickup-truck counterpart. Along with minor revisions in 1975, 1977, and 1980, the model line underwent a more substantial revision in 1981, followed by updates in 1983 and 1985.

=== Powertrain details ===
The Suburban shared several engines with the C/K pickup truck line. A 250-cubic-inch inline-six was the standard engine through 1979. The model line was offered with a 307- (1973 only) and 350-cubic-inch small-block V8s; a 454-cubic-inch big-block V8 was optional in C-series Suburbans. For 1976, the 350 V8 was joined by 305- and 400-cubic-inch V8s; the latter was discontinued for 1981. For 1980, V8 engines became standard for the model line, with the 305 returning as the standard engine for 1981. For 1982, GM introduced a 6.2L Detroit Diesel V8 as a higher-efficiency alternative to the 454 V8.

A three-speed manual transmission was offered through the 1980 model year, with a four-speed manual offered through 1988. Initially offered with three-speed Turbo Hydra-Matic 350 and 400 automatic transmissions, a four-speed Turbo Hydra-Matic 700R4 became an option in 1981.

For 1980, K-series Suburbans moved from full-time four-wheel drive to a part-time system, allowing the front axle to freewheel. For 1981, the shift-on-the fly 4×4 system adopted automatic-locking front hubs; the NP208 transfer case replaced the NP205 in most examples.

=== R/V series (1987–1991) ===
For 1987, GM rebranded the Rounded-Line C/K series as the R/V series to accommodate the launch of the 1988 GMT400-platform C/K trucks, which were being launched in the spring of 1987. For 1987, the gasoline engines of the model converted from carbureted fuel delivery to electronic fuel injection (using throttle body injection/TBI). For 1988, the 5.0L engine was dropped from the line, with the 5.7L V8 becoming the standard engine. In a trim revision, the R/V line adopted the nomenclature of its GMT400 successor, with all vehicles adopting the 1500/2500/3500 payload series (previously used by GMC) and the base Custom Deluxe trim retired and replaced by a revived Cheyenne trim.

For 1989, the exterior underwent its largest revision since its 1973 introduction. Adopting a style similar to the GMT400, the black-painted grille was offered with quad headlights (economy trims were equipped with two). After using the same design nearly unchanged since 1973, the steering wheel was replaced (adopting the same design as the GMT400).

For 1990, the Suburban introduced power-operated sideview mirrors, also adding the option of rear-wheel ABS. Alongside the Suburban and Blazer/Jimmy, the R/V line was pared down nearly exclusively to one-ton crew-cab pickup and chassis-cab trucks.

For 1991, the four-speed 700R4 automatic transmission was replaced by the electronically controlled 4L80-E unit. After an 18-year production run, the Rounded-Line Suburban ended production as GM shifted crew-cab pickup trucks and full-size SUVs to the GMT400 platform for 1992.

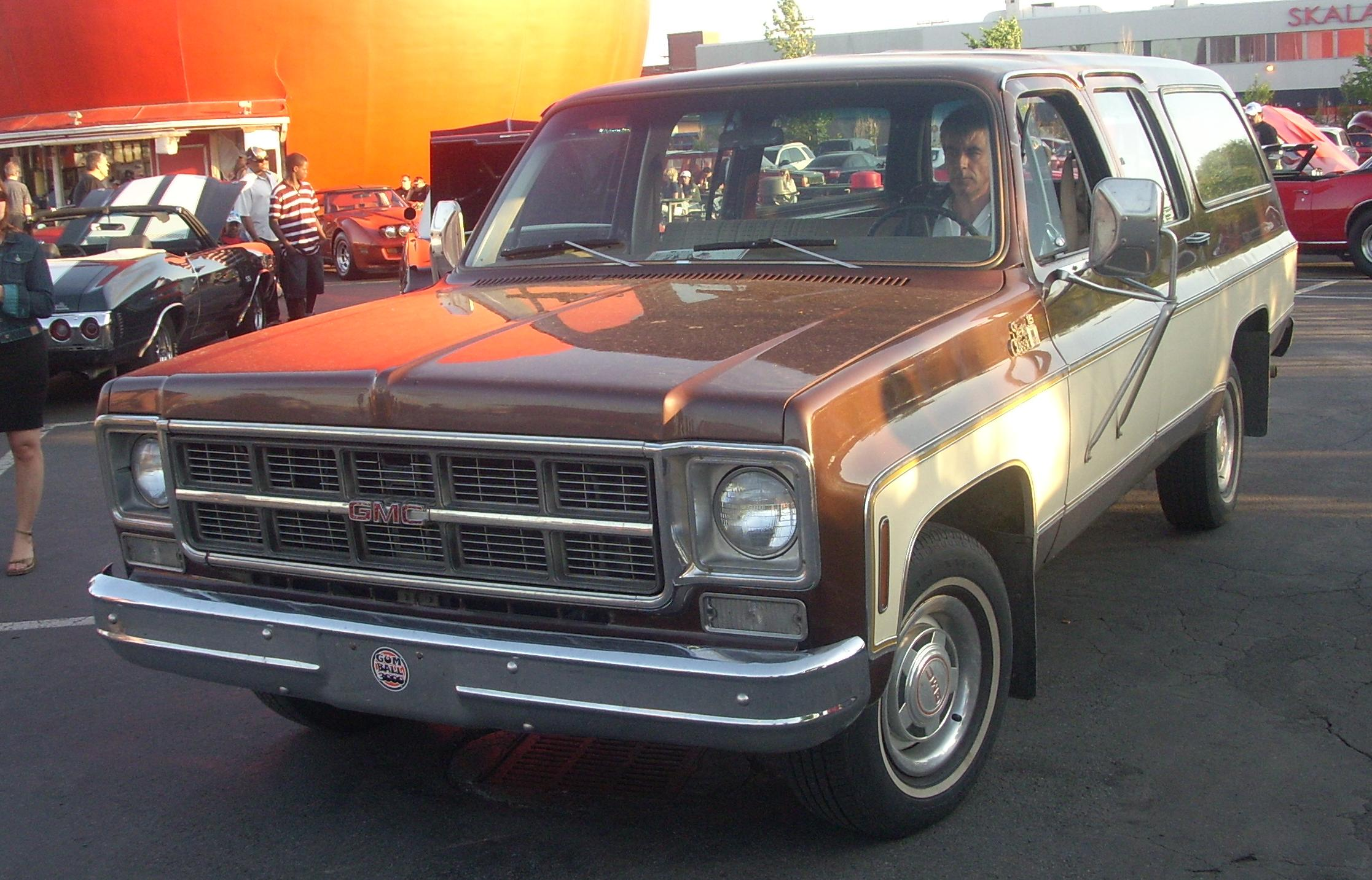
1977 GMC Suburban C15 Sierra Classic

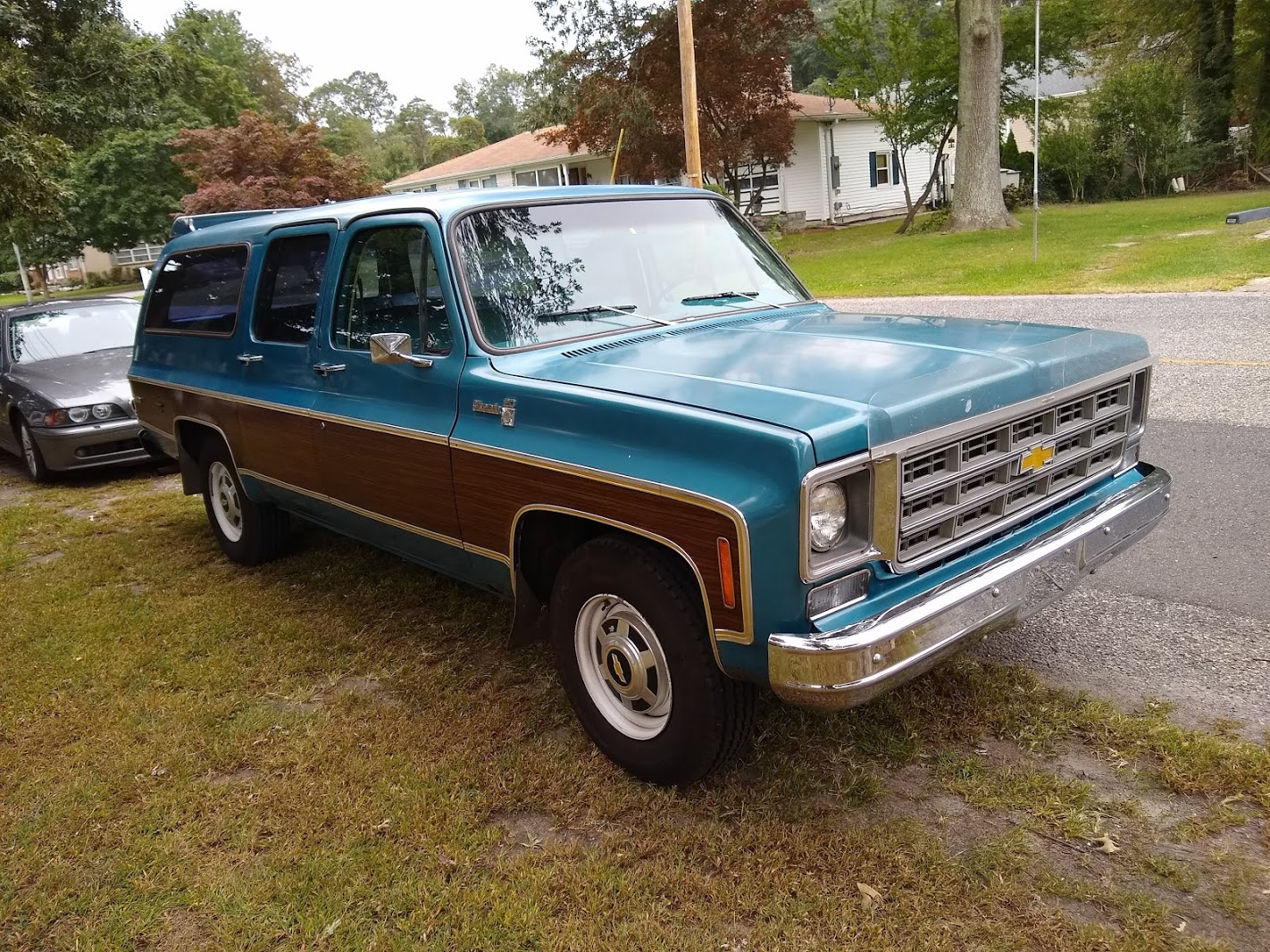
1977 Chevrolet C20 Suburban Estate

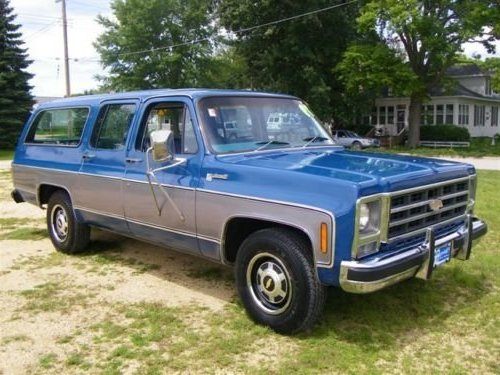
1979 Chevrolet Suburban C20

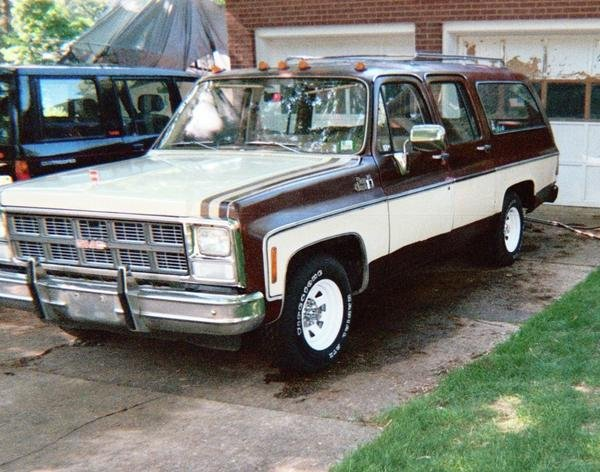
1980 GMC Suburban C15 Sierra Classic

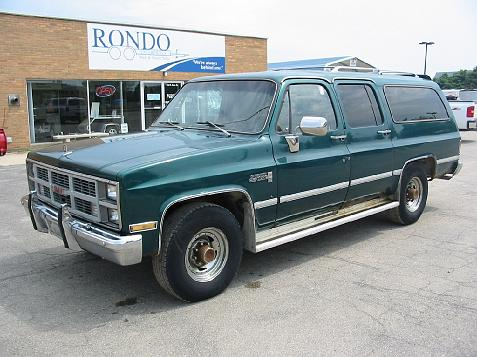
1983 GMC Suburban K25 Diesel

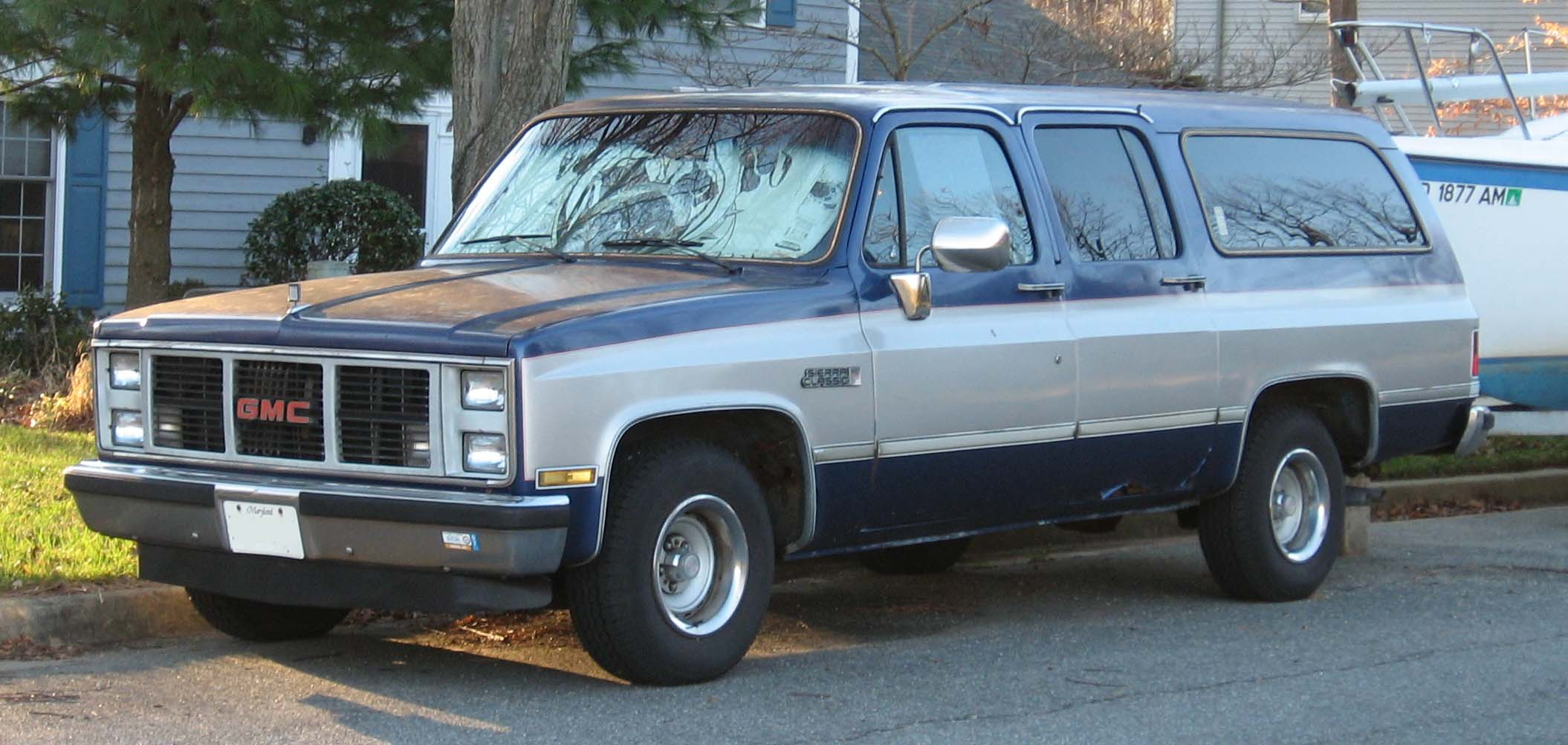
1985–1988 GMC Suburban Sierra Classic

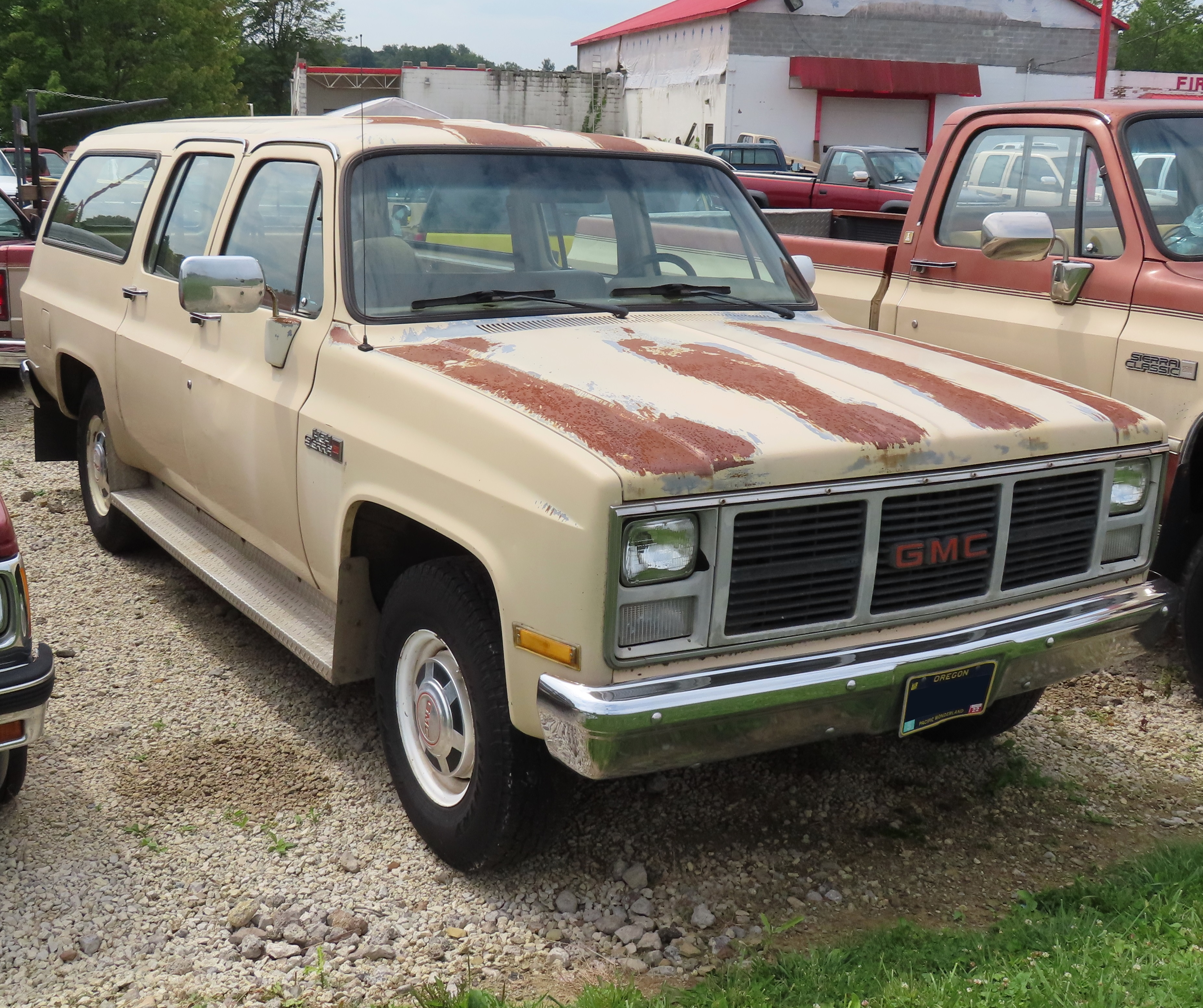
1988 GMC R2500 Suburban High Sierra

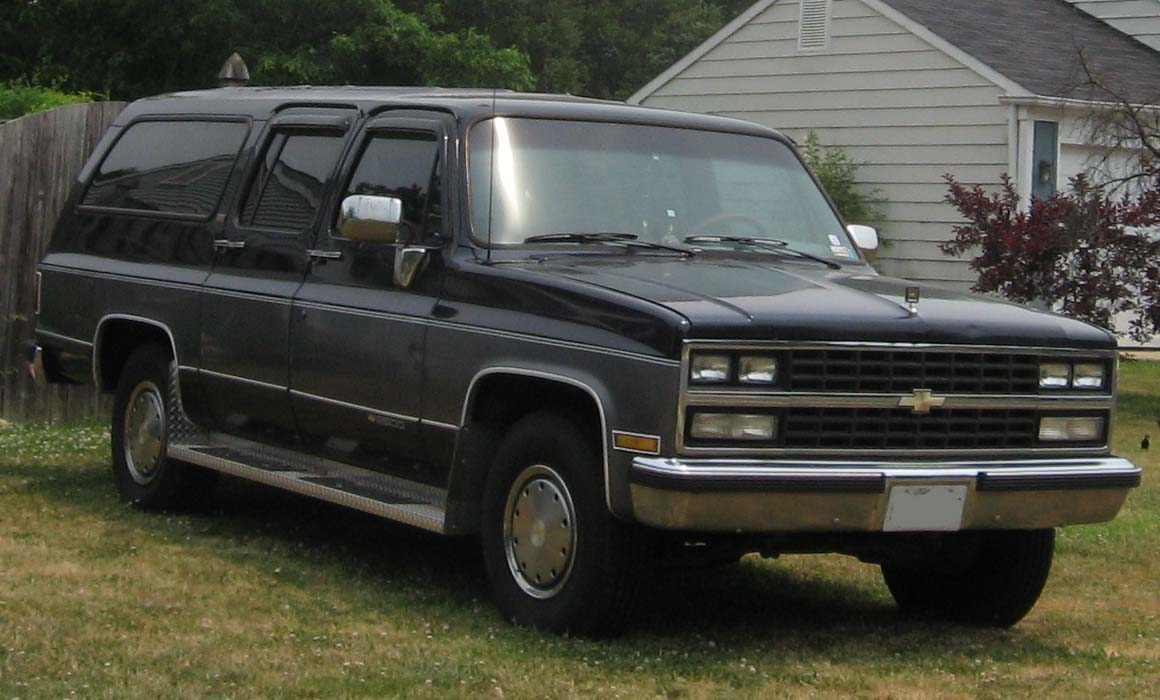
1989–1991 Chevrolet Suburban 2500 Silverado

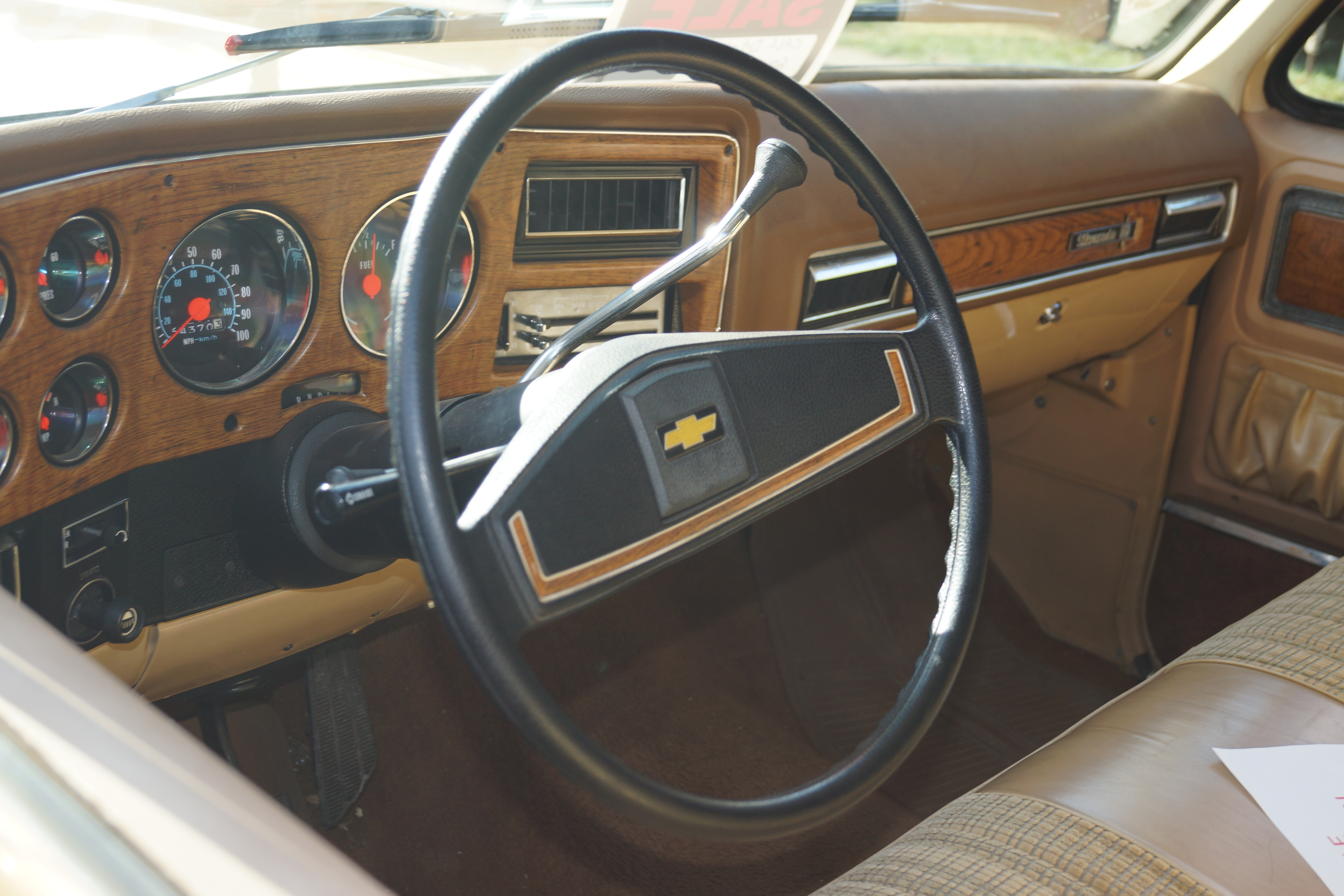
1977 Suburban Estate dashboard

== Eighth generation (1992) ==
GMT400
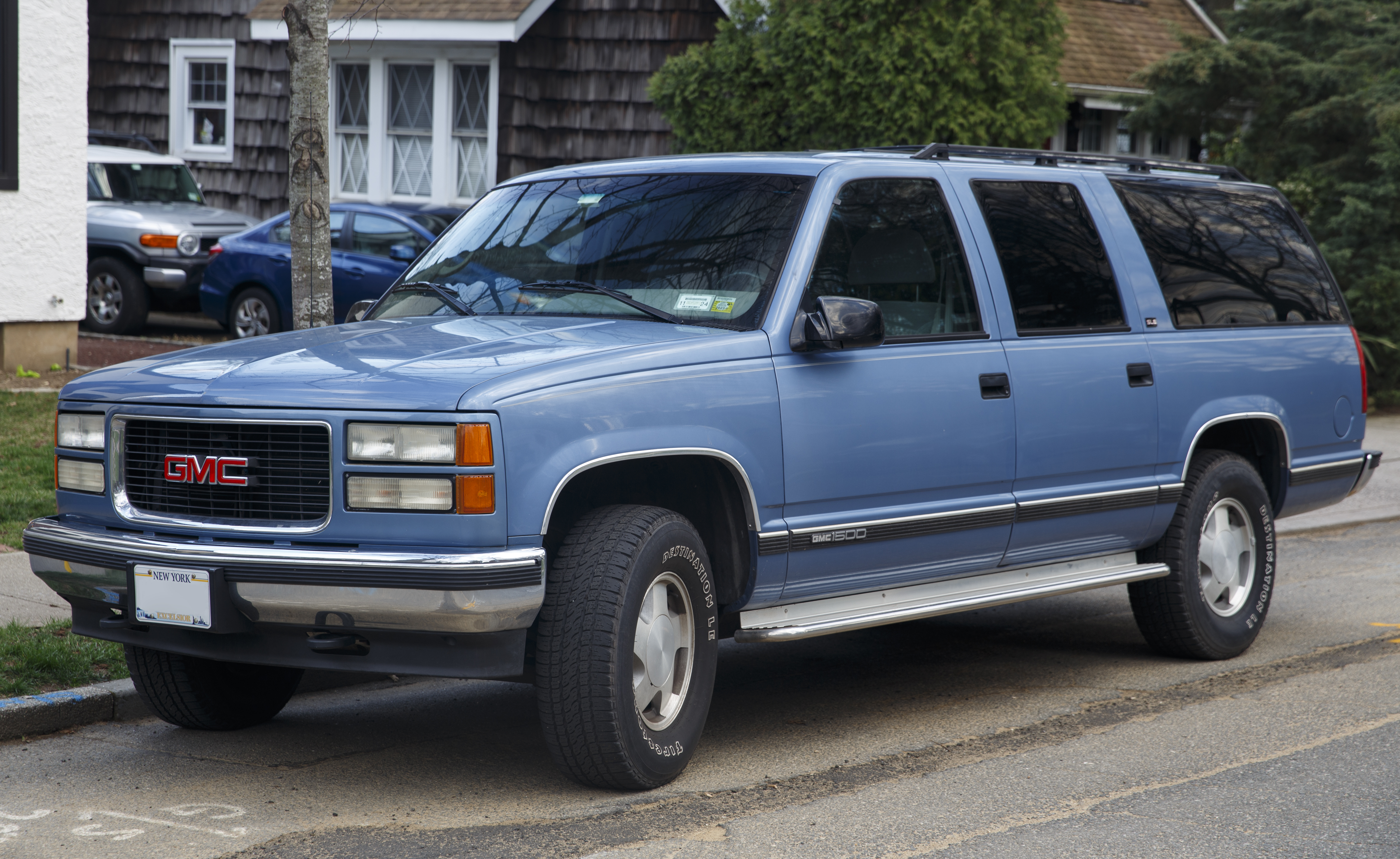
- 1995 GMC Suburban 1500

Overview
- Also called: GMC Suburban; Holden Suburban (Oceania)
- Model years: 1992–1999 (U.S.); 1998–2001 (Australia)

Body and chassis
- Platform: GMT410/425

Chronology
- Successor: GMC Yukon XL (for GMC Suburban)

The eighth-generation Suburban was introduced in December 1991 for 1992, moving from the Rounded-Line chassis to the GMT400 architecture. Four years after the redesigned C/K pickup trucks debuted, the GMT400 transition was applied to the Suburban, K5 Blazer and Yukon (replacing the full-size Jimmy nameplate), and crew-cab pickup/chassis-cab vehicles. Reverting from the placeholder R/V back to the C/K nomenclature for rear-wheel drive and 4x4 vehicles, the Suburban was offered in "½-ton" (1500) and "¾-ton" (2500) payload series.

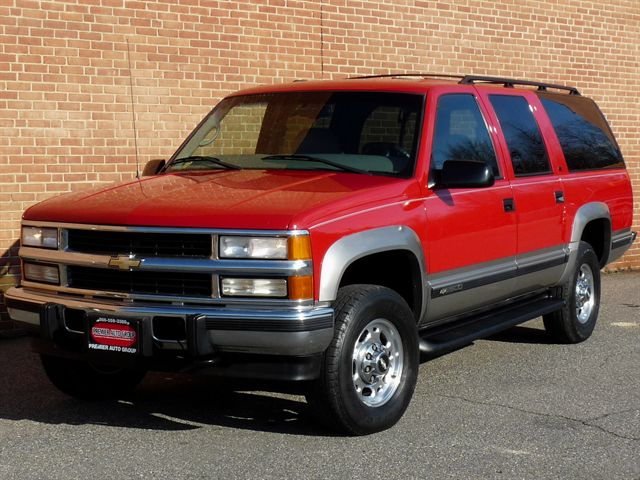
1997-1999 Chevrolet Suburban K2500 6.5L turbodiesel V8

The GMT400 Suburban introduced an independent front suspension to 4WD models. 4WD models used torsion bars in the front suspension, while 2WD models continued to use coil springs. All models used a live axle and leaf springs in the rear. While the Suburban was not offered with a 4.3L V6 or 5.0L V8, the 5.7L engine was standard; the 7.4L V8 was optional on 2500-series vehicles. For 1994, a turbodiesel V8 was introduced for the first time, as the 6.5L V8 replaced the 6.2L V8 (last offered in 1991; there was no diesel engine available for 1992-93 Suburbans). For 1996, both gasoline engines were replaced with updated Vortec-series engines.

This generation followed the development of its pickup truck counterpart during its production. Along with a 1994 exterior update, the model line saw multiple functional updates, including the introduction of driver-side and dual airbags (1995 and 1997, respectively), daytime running lights (1996), and the addition of OnStar (1998).

The GMT400 Suburban again supported the Chevrolet K5 Blazer three-door wagon (the GMC Jimmy becoming the GMC Yukon), with the Blazer sharing its entire rear roofline with the Suburban. For 1995, Chevrolet renamed the K5 Blazer as the Chevrolet Tahoe, with the three-door wagon joined by a five-door wagon (a shorter-wheelbase version of the Suburban with two rows of seating); the shorter five-door wagon served as the basis for the introductory Yukon Denali and Cadillac Escalade for 1999.

The GMT400 generation was also imported from Mexico to Australia and New Zealand by Holden. The division marketed the vehicles as a Holden Suburban between February 1998 and January 2001 with various minor changes (beyond the conversion to right-hand-drive).

== Ninth generation (2000) ==
GMT830
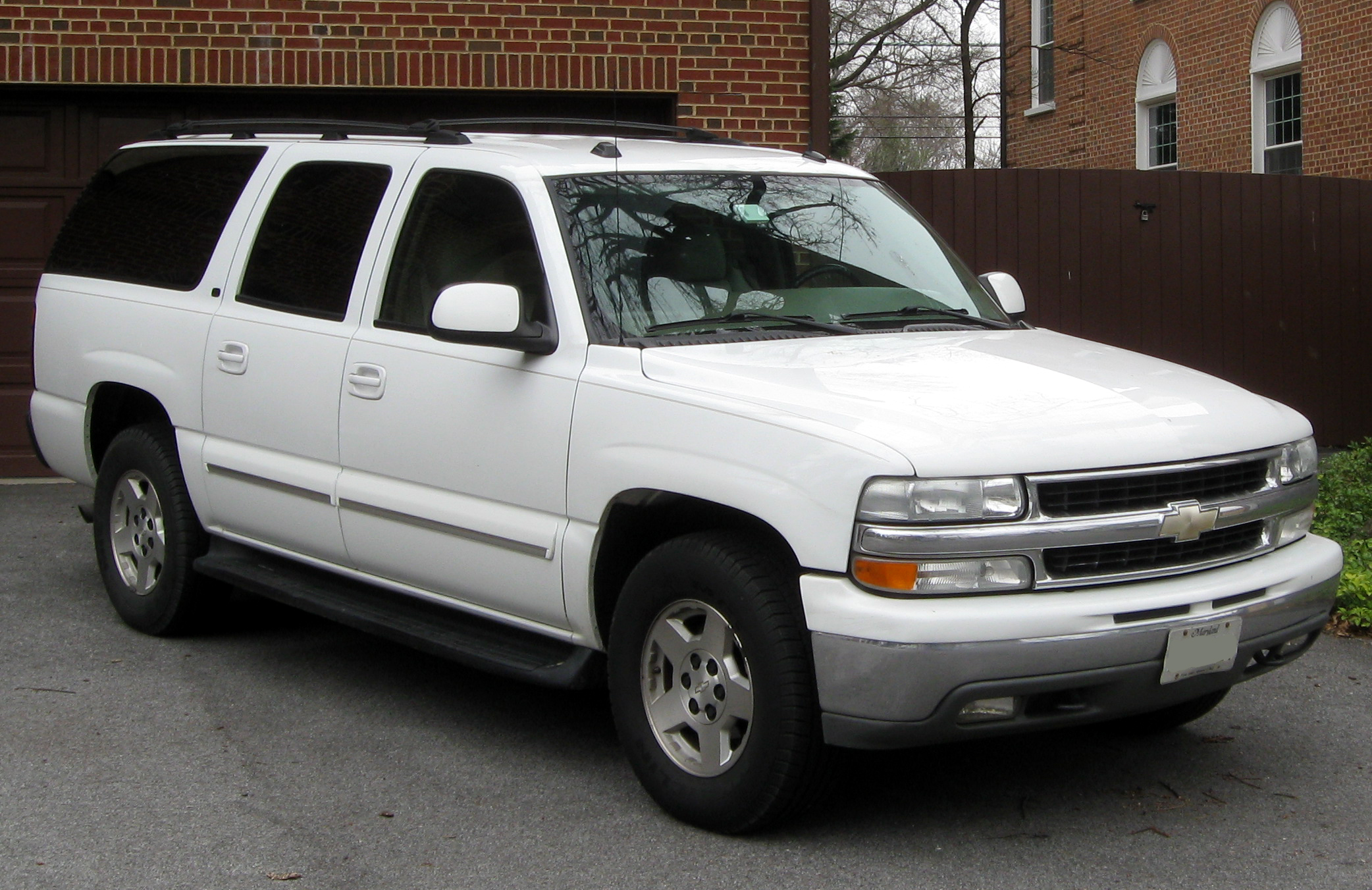
- 2000–2006 Chevrolet Suburban

Overview
- Also called: GMC Suburban (Middle East); GMC Yukon XL; Cadillac Escalade ESV
- Production: October 1999 – March 2006
- Model years: 2000–2006
- Assembly: Janesville, Wisconsin, United States (Janesville Assembly); Arlington, Texas, United States (Arlington Assembly); Silao, Guanajuato, Mexico (Silao Assembly)
- Designer: Wayne Cherry (1996)

Body and chassis
- Body style: 4-door SUV
- Layout: Front engine, rear-wheel drive / four-wheel drive
- Platform: GMT830
- Related: Chevrolet Silverado/GMC Sierra; Chevrolet Avalanche/Cadillac Escalade EXT; Chevrolet Tahoe/GMC Yukon; Cadillac Escalade; Hummer H2

Powertrain
- Engine: 5.3 L (325 cu in) Vortec 5300 LM7 V8 (Gen III) (1500 only); 5.3 L (325 cu in) Vortec 5300 L59 flex fuel V8 (Gen III) (1500 only) (2002–2006); 5.7 L (350 cu in) Vortec L31 V8 (2000–2002 Mexico Only); 6.0 L (364 cu in) Vortec 6000 LQ4 V8 (Gen III) (optional on 1500 in 2006; standard on 2500); 8.1 L (496 cu in) Vortec 8100 L18 V8 (optional on 2500 only)
- Transmission: 4-speed 4L60E automatic (1500 only); 4-speed 4L65E automatic (1500 w/ 6.0 L engine only); 4-speed 4L80E automatic (2500 w/ 6.0 L engine only); 4-speed 4L85E automatic (2500 w/ 8.1 L engine only)

Dimensions
- Wheelbase: 130.0 in (3,302 mm)
- Length: 219.3 in (5,570 mm)
- Width: 78.8–79.8 in (2,002–2,027 mm)
- Height: 73.3 in (1,862 mm) (2000–02 Chevy 1500 4WD) – 77.1 in (1,958 mm) (Yukon XL 2500 4WD)

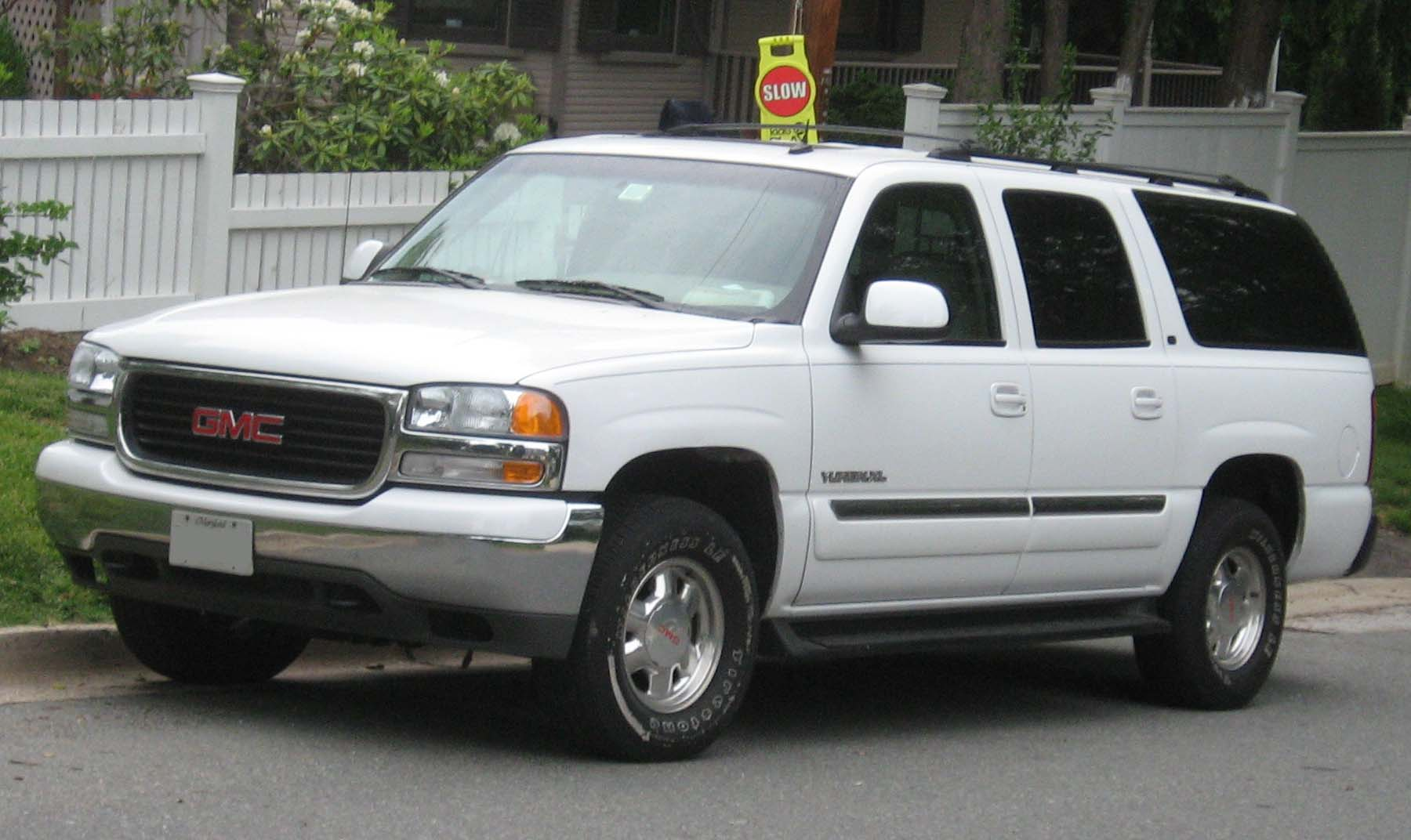
GMT800 GMC Yukon XL

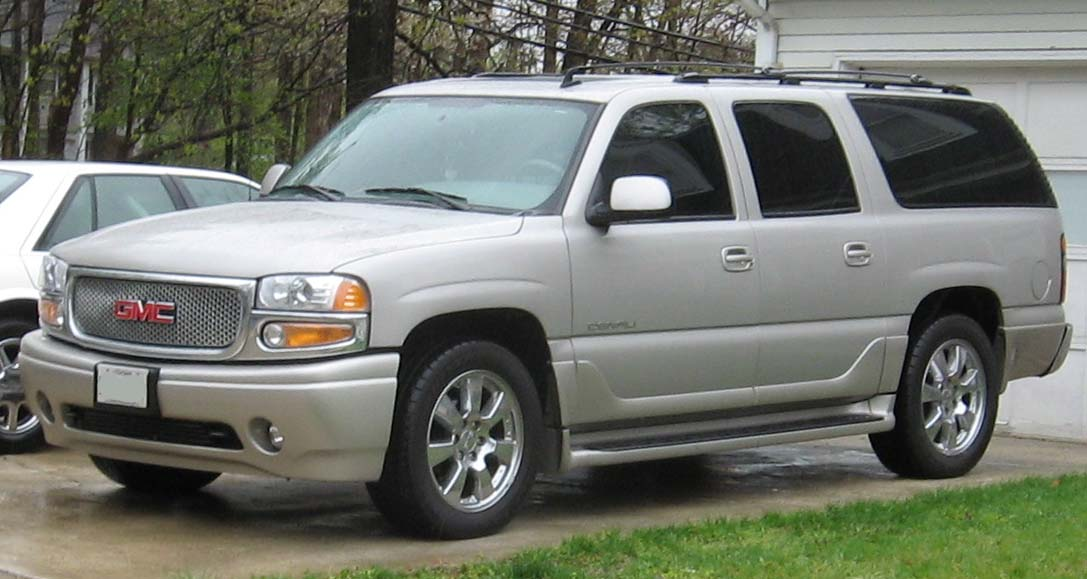
2006 GMC Yukon XL Denali

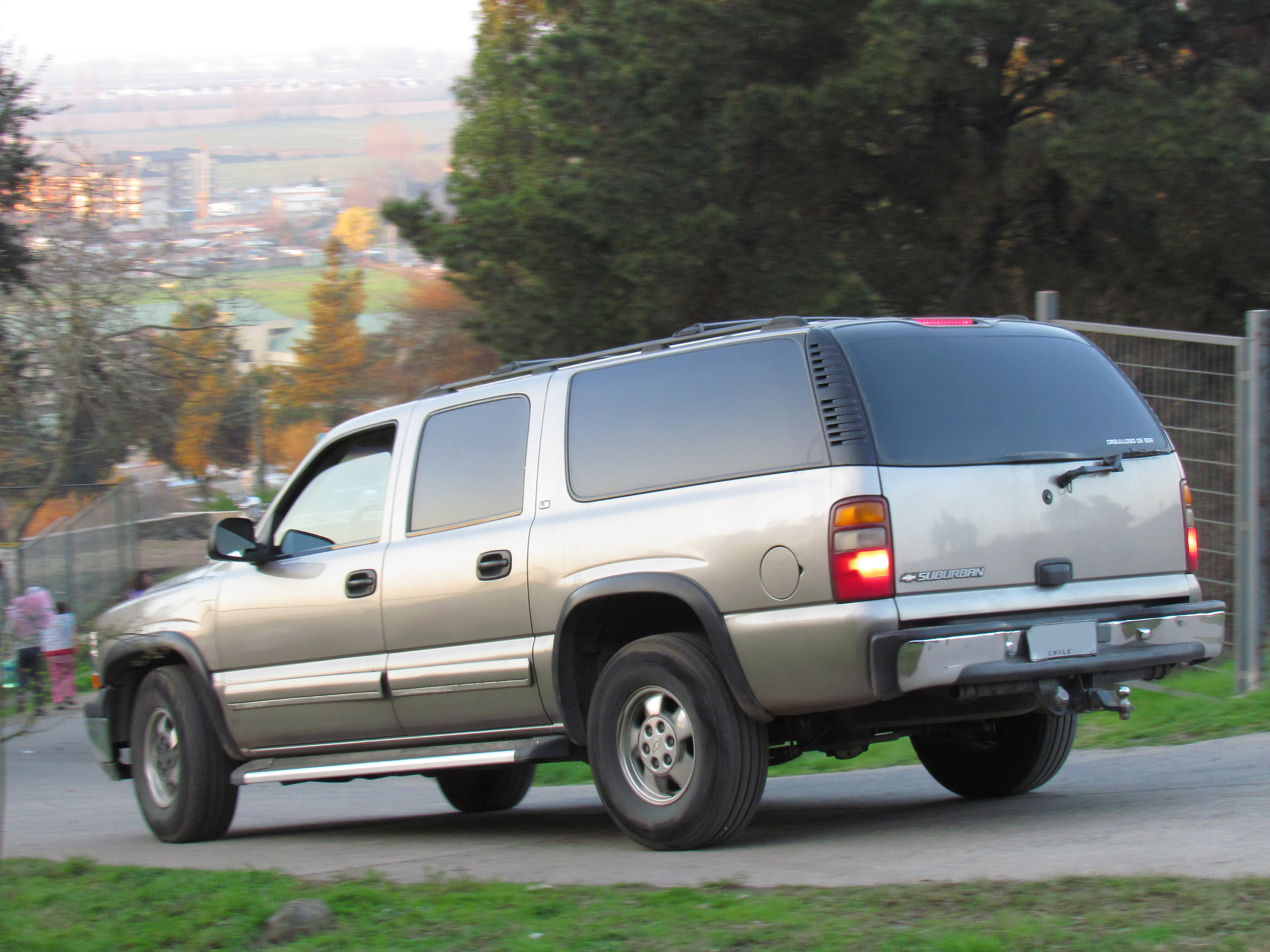
Chevrolet Suburban LS

The GMT800-based Suburbans were introduced in late December 1999 (Texas only) and January 2000 (nationally) for the 2000 model year. They were sold in two series: 1/2-ton 1500 and 3/4-ton 2500. Suburbans came in Base, LS, and LT trims. Optional was a push-button 4WD with a low-range transfer case. A tow hitch with a trailer wiring plug was optional.

For 2000, Chevrolet's long-serving 5.7L and 7.4L V8 engines were retired along with the 6.5L diesel (except in Mexico, until 2002). New engines were the LS-based 5.3L Vortec for the 1500 series and 6.0L Vortec for the 2500 series.

Where Chevrolet kept the Tahoe/Suburban branding, GMC renamed its GMT800 products Yukon and Yukon XL, a change that continues to this day. The shorter 116" wheelbase became the Yukon, and the full-length 130" wheelbase became the Yukon XL. Yukons were built in SLE, SLT, and Denali trims.

New features included:

- A spare tire relocated beneath the vehicle (instead of in the cargo area as on previous models)
- "Puddle lamps" in the exterior mirrors on LS and LT models
- Electronic climate control available on LT models
- Four-wheel disc brakes
- Load-leveling Autoride suspension available on LT models
- Premium Ride rear self-leveling suspension available on LS models
- Digital components
- Redesigned wheels
- Redesigned interior with new dashboard and instrument panel including a driver message center and engine hour meter
- Taillights with separate amber-colored turn signal indicators

=== Yearly changes ===
- 2001: The 6.0-liter V8 in 2500-series Suburbans gained 20 hp (15 kW; 20 PS) from a number of changes including aluminum cylinder heads. The new Vortec 8100 8.1 L (496 cu in) V8 was added as an option for the 2500 as well. OnStar became standard on LT models and LS models with the new Z71 package. The exterior "1500" and "2500" door badges on Chevrolet models began being slowly phased out partway through the model year. Two-tone paint was also discontinued.
- 2002: Several optional features were made standard equipment on the LS model, including front and rear air conditioning, alloy wheels, power windows, power front seats, side steps, fog lamps, and heated outside rearview mirrors. Base models were discontinued, leaving LS and LT. Door badges on the Chevrolet models were completely removed. The Vortec 5300 L59 variant in the 1500 series added flex-fuel capability.
- 2003: All GM full-size trucks received an upgraded interior, with better-quality materials and other enhancements. New radios offered Radio Data System compatibility, XM satellite radio, Bose sound and improved ergonomics. Adjustable pedals were added as an option, and the instrument cluster-mounted Driver Information Center was improved and monitored up to 34 vehicle functions. A Panasonic DVD system was added as an option. GM's Stabilitrak system was added, and Quadrasteer became available on 2500 series Suburbans. Towing capacity for Quadrasteer-equipped vehicles was reduced by 300 pounds (140 kg) (the weight of the system). Although the pickup trucks received a revised front fascia, it was not carried over to the SUVs (except for Suburban/Tahoe ~ Sonora, in Mexico only).
- 2004: 1500-series Suburbans received the Hydroboost braking system that was previously introduced in the 2500 series. The Mexican-market Suburban received a front-end update that year, matching that of the Silverado.
- 2005: New updated body side moldings, barn doors were discontinued in favor of the formerly optional liftgate. All 1500 model engines switched to electrically driven radiator e-fans to reduce power loss and fuel consumption, updated side assist steps, and a lower air deflector were put in place for fuel economy gains of about one MPG. The Z71 package, long exclusive to 4WD models, became available on 2WD Suburbans. Z71 also featured updated side pillar emblems; the "Suburban" tailgate emblem returned on Z71 models, where a Z71 badge had been in previous years (2001-2004). OnStar also became standard across the board. This was the last year for the Quadrasteer option. Finally, Stabilitrak became standard on all models shortly after the start of the model year. The 2005 Suburban 1500 won the J.D. Power and Associates award for highest initial quality among large SUVs, beating out its rivals, the Ford Expedition and Toyota Sequoia.
- 2006: The GMT800 Suburban's last year. A special LTZ trim package became available, featuring 20-inch (510 mm) wheels, all-wheel drive, and the LQ4 6.0L engine from the GMC Yukon Denali. The catalytic converters were relocated closer to the engine. The XM radio antenna and the OnStar antenna were combined into a single "Shark Fin" antenna.

=== Engines ===
Year	Engine	Power	Torque	RPO Code	VIN Code (8th Digit)	Notes
2000–2003	5.3L Vortec 5300 V8	285 hp (213 kW) @ 5200 RPM	325 lb⋅ft (441 N⋅m) @ 4000 RPM	LM7 L59 (flex-fuel)	T Z (flex-fuel)	Power and torque ratings are on regular gasoline. Flex-fuel option available from 2002 to 2006.
2004–2005	5.3L Vortec 5300 V8	295 hp (220 kW) @ 5200 RPM	330 lb⋅ft (450 N⋅m) @ 4000 RPM	LM7 L59 (flex-fuel)	T Z (flex-fuel)	Power and torque ratings are on regular gasoline. Flex-fuel option available from 2002 to 2006.
2006	5.3L Vortec 5300 V8	295 hp (220 kW) @ 5200 RPM	335 lb⋅ft (454 N⋅m) @ 4000 RPM	LM7 L59 (flex-fuel)	T Z (flex-fuel)	Power and torque ratings are on regular gasoline. Flex-fuel option available from 2002 to 2006.
2001–2002	6.0L Vortec 6000 V8	320 hp (239 kW) @ 5200 RPM	365 lb⋅ft (495 N⋅m) @ 4000 RPM	LQ4	U	GMC Yukon Denali and 2006 Suburban LTZ only.
2003	6.0L Vortec 6000 V8	320 hp (239 kW) @ 5000 RPM	365 lb⋅ft (495 N⋅m) @ 4000 RPM	LQ4	U	GMC Yukon Denali and 2006 Suburban LTZ only.
2004	6.0L Vortec 6000 V8	325 hp (242 kW) @ 5200 RPM	365 lb⋅ft (495 N⋅m) @ 4000 RPM	LQ4	U	GMC Yukon Denali and 2006 Suburban LTZ only.
2005–2006	6.0L Vortec 6000 V8	335 hp (250 kW) @ 5200 RPM	375 lb⋅ft (508 N⋅m) @ 4000 RPM	LQ4	U	GMC Yukon Denali and 2006 Suburban LTZ only.
2000	6.0L Vortec 6000 V8	300 hp (224 kW) @ 5000 RPM	355 lb⋅ft (481 N⋅m) @ 4000 RPM	LQ4	U	2500 only. 2000 models used cast-iron heads.
2001–2003	6.0L Vortec 6000 V8	320 hp (239 kW) @ 5000 RPM	360 lb⋅ft (490 N⋅m) @ 4000 RPM	LQ4	U	2500 only. 2000 models used cast-iron heads.
2004	6.0L Vortec 6000 V8	325 hp (242 kW) @ 4000 RPM	369 lb⋅ft (500 N⋅m) @ 4000 RPM	LQ4	U	2500 only. 2000 models used cast-iron heads.
2005	6.0L Vortec 6000 V8	325 hp (242 kW) @ 5200 RPM	365 lb⋅ft (495 N⋅m) @ 4000 RPM	LQ4	U	2500 only. 2000 models used cast-iron heads.
2006	6.0L Vortec 6000 V8	335 hp (250 kW) @ 5200 RPM	375 lb⋅ft (508 N⋅m) @ 4000 RPM	LQ4	U	2500 only. 2000 models used cast-iron heads.
2001–2003	8.1L Vortec 8100 V8	340 hp (254 kW) @ 4200 RPM	455 lb⋅ft (617 N⋅m) @ 3200 RPM	L18	G	2500 only.
2004	8.1L Vortec 8100 V8	320 hp (239 kW) @ 4200 RPM	445 lb⋅ft (603 N⋅m) @ 3200 RPM	L18	G	2500 only.
2005	8.1L Vortec 8100 V8	320 hp (239 kW) @ 4200 RPM	440 lb⋅ft (600 N⋅m) @ 3200 RPM	L18	G	2500 only.
2006	8.1L Vortec 8100 V8	325 hp (242 kW) @ 4200 RPM	447 lb⋅ft (606 N⋅m) @ 3200 RPM	L18	G	2500 only.

In addition, a Vortec 5700 350 cu in (5.7 L) L31 V8 remained in use in 2000–2002 Suburbans, Tahoes (called Sonora), and Silverado pickup trucks in the Mexican market.

== Tenth generation (2007) ==
GMT900
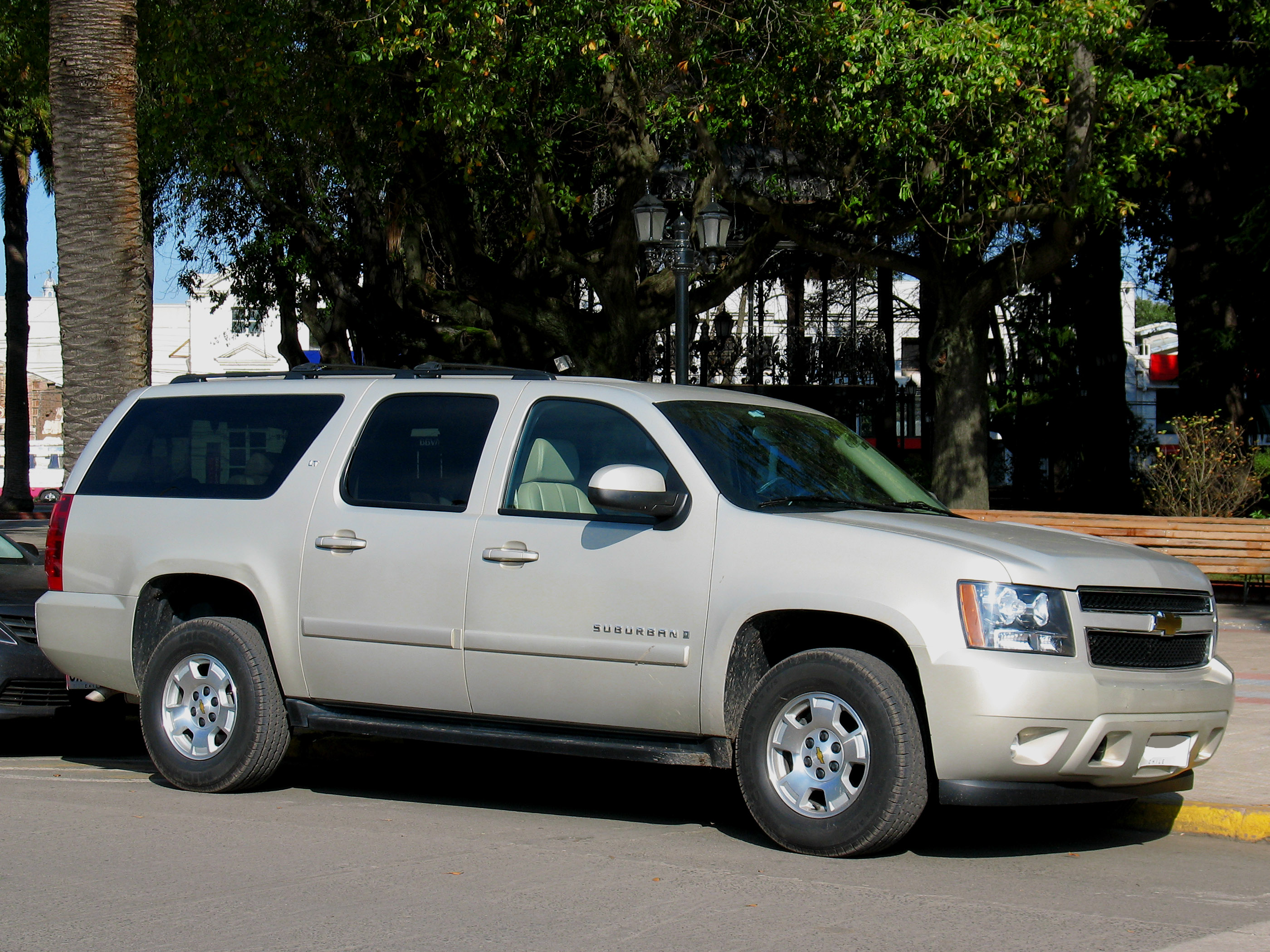
- 2008 Chevrolet Suburban LT

Overview
- Also called: GMC Yukon XL; Cadillac Escalade ESV; VIA VTrux SUV
- Production: January 2006 – December 2013
- Model years: 2007–2014
- Assembly: Janesville, Wisconsin, U.S. (Janesville Assembly: 2007–2009); Arlington, Texas, U.S. (Arlington Assembly); Silao, Guanajuato, Mexico (Silao Assembly: 2007–2009)
- Designer: Wayne Cherry (2002)

Body and chassis
- Body style: 4-door SUV
- Layout: Front engine, rear-wheel drive / four-wheel drive
- Platform: GMT930: GMT931 (Suburban); GMT932 (Yukon XL)
- Related: Cadillac Escalade; Chevrolet Avalanche; Chevrolet Tahoe/GMC Yukon; T-98 Kombat/Dartz

Powertrain
- Engine: 5.3 L (325 cu in) Vortec 5300 LY5 V8 (1500 only); 5.3 L (325 cu in) Vortec 5300 LMG flex fuel V8 (optional on 1500 only); 6.0 L (364 cu in) Vortec 6000 L76 V8 (1500 only) (optional from 2007–2009); 6.0 L (364 cu in) Vortec 6000 LY6 V8 (2500 only); 6.2 L (376 cu in) Vortec 6200 V8 (GMC Yukon XL 1500 Denali only)
- Transmission: 4-speed 4L60E automatic (1500 only) (standard from 2007–2009); 4-speed 4L80E automatic (2500 only) (standard 2007 only); 6-speed 6L80 automatic (1500 only) (optional in 2009, standard from 2010–2014); 6-speed 6L90 automatic (2500 only) (standard from 2008–2013)

Dimensions
- Wheelbase: 130.0 in (3,302 mm)
- Length: 222.4 in (5,649 mm)
- Width: 79.1 in (2,009 mm)
- Height: 76.8 in (1,951 mm); Denali: 77.1 in (1,958 mm)
- Curb weight: 2,540–2,857 kg (5,600–6,299 lb)

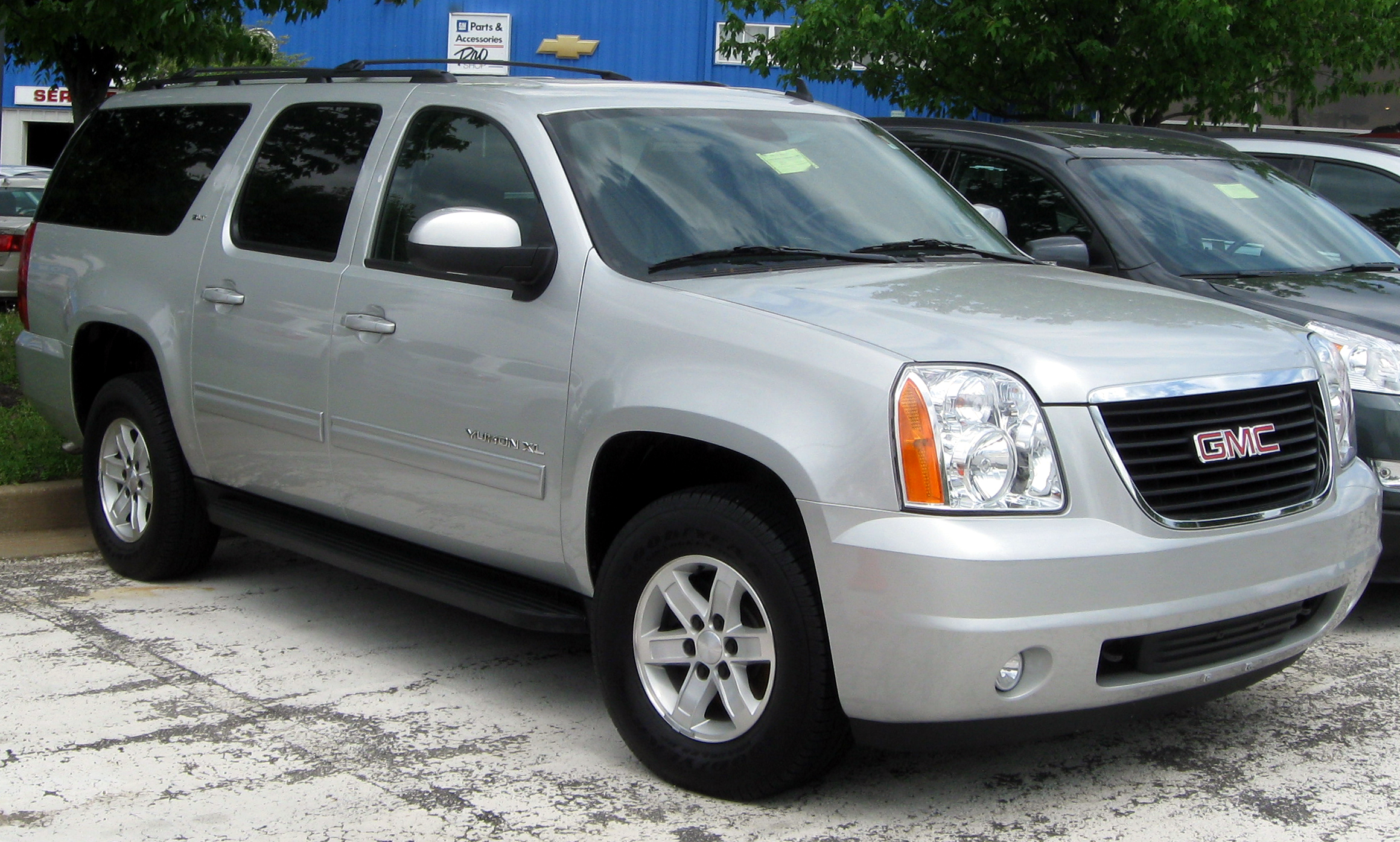
2010 GMC Yukon XL SLT

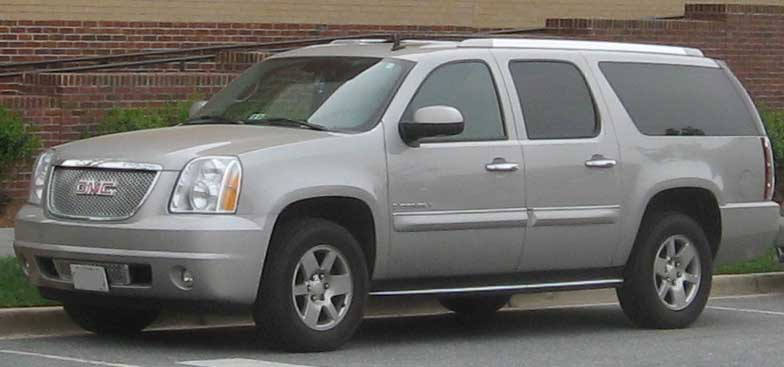
GMT900 GMC Yukon XL Denali

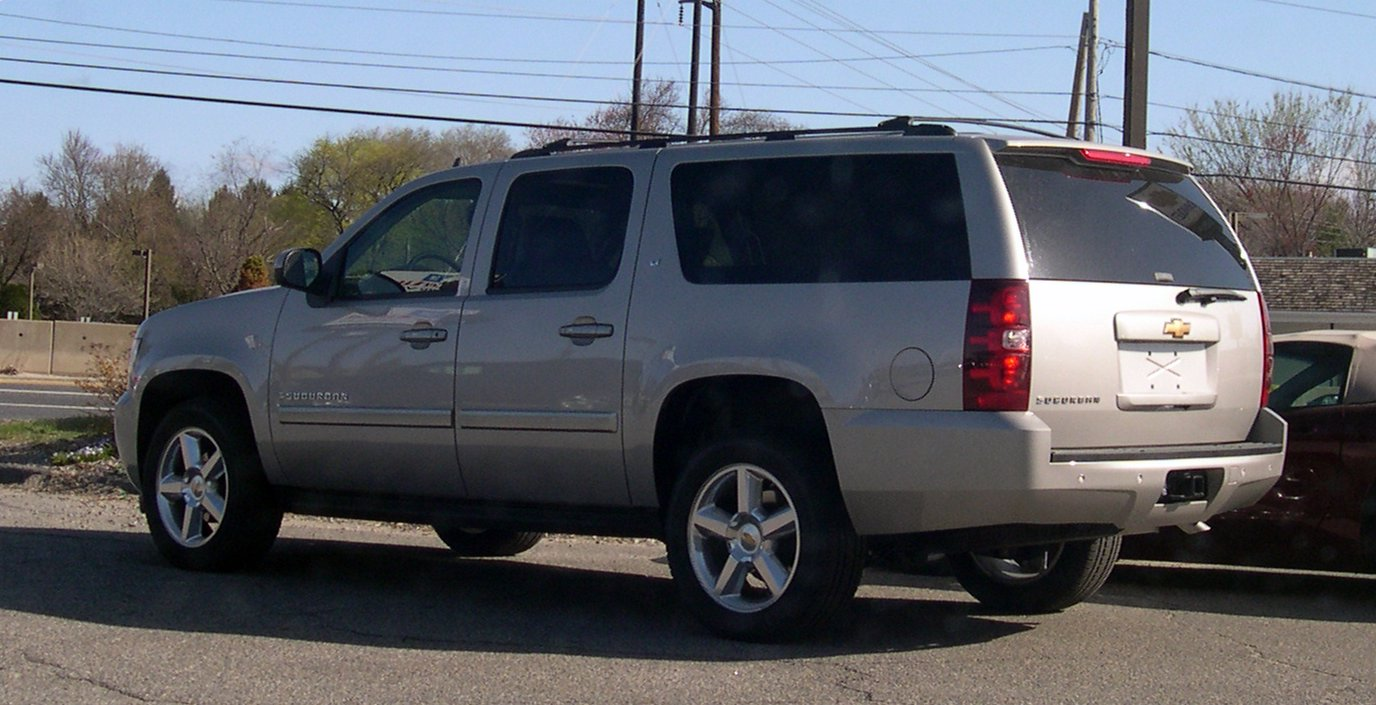
2007 Chevrolet Suburban LT

The 2007 model year Suburban and Yukon XL were unveiled at the 2006 Los Angeles Auto Show in January. Production of the redesigned GMT900 Suburban and Yukon XL began at Janesville Assembly and Silao Assembly in January 2006 (Suburban) and April 2006 (Yukon XL), with the vehicles arriving at dealerships in April 2006.

The new models were redesigned with more modern and rounded styling, already seen on the previously released 2007 Tahoes and Yukons. For the first time, the SUVs did not share any exterior parts with the pickup trucks except for the doors. The exterior features a more aerodynamic shape, made partly by a steeply raked windshield angle.

The interior had a redesigned dashboard and improved seats. It still retained its nine-passenger seating availability, which was available on LS and SLE models only. LT2 and LT3 models have leather seating and available six-, seven-, and eight-passenger seating. A Z71 package was available on LT2 and LT3 models which included two-tone leather seats. All Mexican-built Suburbans including the nine-seat models offered the special two-tone leather seating used by the Z71. The Suburban LTZ came standard with a DVD player and a GPS-enhanced touchscreen radio.

For the 2010 model year, in which U.S. News & World Report ranked it as the number-one affordable large SUV, the Suburban added a premium interior package that included tri-zone climate control and features like Bluetooth and rear audio controls. Additionally, radios added a USB port, allowing for music to be played from auxiliary devices through the radio, as well as charging other small electronics. Side blind zone alert became an option on LT and standard on LTZ. The 6.0-liter engine in the 2010 models was also flex-fuel capable. Minor front-end changes including a slightly raised front bumper and side torso airbags were also made standard for 2010.

In February 2010, Chevrolet unveiled a 75th anniversary edition of the Suburban, which had the LTZ trim with white diamond tricoat exterior paint and cashmere interior, along with standard 20-inch chrome-clad wheels, revised roof rails, integrated navigation radio, XM Satellite Radio, Bluetooth phone connectivity, rearview camera, rear park assist, remote starting, adjustable pedals, and leather upholstery with heated/cooled front seats. According to Chevrolet, only 2,570 units of this special edition would be produced due to the amount of white diamond paint GM could procure.

The 5.3-liter and 6.0-liter engines were improved, and a new 403-horsepower (301 kW; 409 PS) 6.2-liter Vortec V8 was added for the Yukon XL Denali. The 8.1-liter engine was dropped.

For the 2011 model year, the Suburban added three new exterior colors to the lineup: Mocha Steel Metallic, Green Steel Metallic, and Ice Blue Metallic. More features became standard on each trim, with the rear audio system, Bluetooth, floor console/storage area, woodgrain interior, luggage rack rails, body-color exterior door handle/mirror caps, and premium-cloth front bucket seats now standard on the LS trim, and chrome recovery hooks, two-speed transfer case, and 20-inch chrome wheels standard on LTZ 4WD models. In addition, the trailering package featured the trailer brake controller as standard on all trims.

For the 2012 model year, trailer sway control and Hill Start Assist became standard on all trims, while the LTZ trim added a heated steering wheel as standard. Also, the LT1/2 options for the Suburban and SLE1/2 and SLT1/2 options on the Yukon XL were discontinued, leaving the Suburban with only an LS, LT, and LTZ trim and the Yukon XL with an SLE and SLT trim. In 2012, GMC celebrated its 100th anniversary by releasing a special edition of its Yukon XL, offering a Heritage Edition trim package. This was the final year that the colors Graystone Metallic, Gold Mist Metallic, and Blue Topaz Metallic would be offered, along with the all-season blackwall P265/65R18 tires.

For the 2013 model year, two new colors were offered: Champagne Silver Metallic and Blue Ray Metallic (extra charge). Also new was Powertrain Grade Braking, normal mode. The 2013 model arrived at Chevrolet dealers in June 2012.

For the 2014 model year, power-adjustable pedals, remote vehicle starter system, and rear parking assist, along with rear vision camera and inside mirror with camera display, became standard on the Suburban LS trims. Concord Metallic (which was supposed to be available for the 2013 MY) was added to the Suburban color offerings for the 2014 models. For the Yukon XL, a convenience package became standard on its SLE models, along with a new color, Deep Indigo Metallic. In February 2014, the Suburban came in second behind the Tahoe among the top-ranked large affordable SUVs by U.S. News & World Report. This was followed by its acknowledgement as an award recipient in the large SUV category by JD Power and Associates in July 2014.

The three-quarter-ton model's towing capacity is 9,600 lb (4,400 kg), being one of the best of any 4×4 SUV and unmatched by any other SUV. The towing capacity of the Suburban 2500 was unmatched, but also uncontested because of the discontinuation of the Ford Excursion in 2006. The three-quarter-ton model also has a GCVW of 16,000 lb (7,300 kg).

The 2500 Suburban was originally sourced from Silao, Mexico, from 2007 to 2008, but was moved to the Arlington Assembly plant in Texas for the 2009 model year, where production of all GM full-size SUVs was consolidated after the closing of the Janesville plant.

GM discontinued the 2500 versions of both Suburban and Yukon XL models after the 2013 model year.

== Eleventh generation (2015) ==
GMT K2YC/G
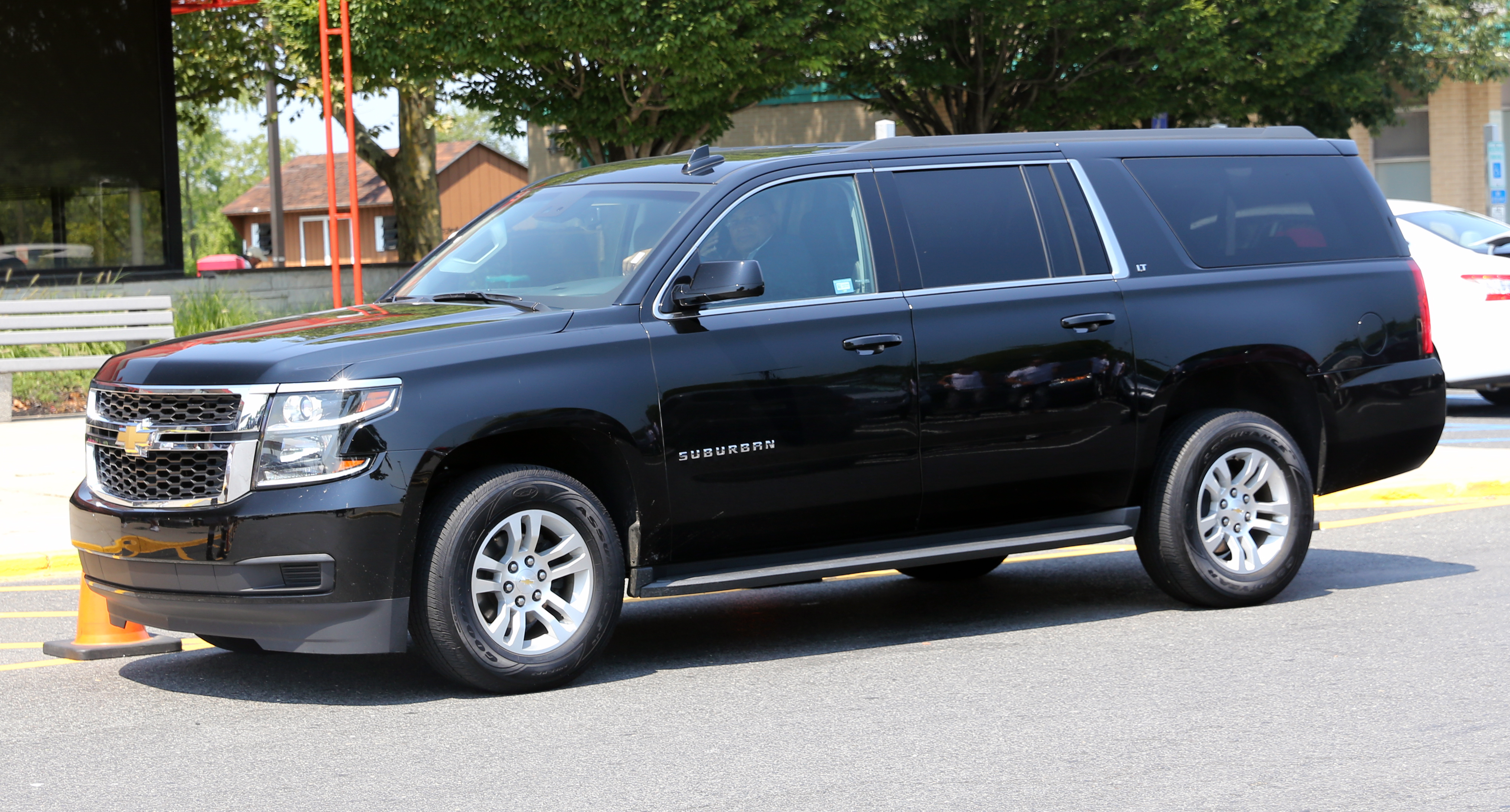
- 2015 Chevrolet Suburban LT

Overview
- Also called: GMC Yukon XL; Cadillac Escalade ESV
- Production: December 2013–December 2019
- Model years: 2015–2020
- Assembly: Arlington, Texas, U.S. (Arlington Assembly)
- Designer: Louis "Chip" Thole, Warrack Leach, Alexandre Henriques, Tyler Moffatt, Fawad Jamil

Body and chassis
- Layout: Front engine, rear-wheel drive / four-wheel drive
- Platform: GMT K2XX; Suburban: GMTK2YC; Yukon XL/Denali XL: GMTK2YG
- Related: Cadillac Escalade; Chevrolet Tahoe/GMC Yukon

Powertrain
- Engine: 5.3 L (325 cu in) EcoTec3 V8 FlexFuel; 6.2 L (376 cu in) EcoTec3 V8 FlexFuel (Yukon XL Denali 2015–present; RST Suburban package, 2019–)
- Transmission: 6-speed GM 6L80 automatic; 8-speed GM 8L90 automatic (Yukon XL Denali); 10-speed Hydra-Matic 10L90 automatic (RST Suburban package, 2019–)

Dimensions
- Wheelbase: 130.0 in (3,302 mm)
- Length: Suburban: 224.4 in (5,700 mm); Yukon XL: 224.3 in (5,697 mm)
- Width: 80.5 in (2,045 mm)
- Height: 74.4 in (1,890 mm); Denali: 77.1 in (1,958 mm)
- Curb weight: 5,586–6,021 pounds (2,534–2,731 kg)

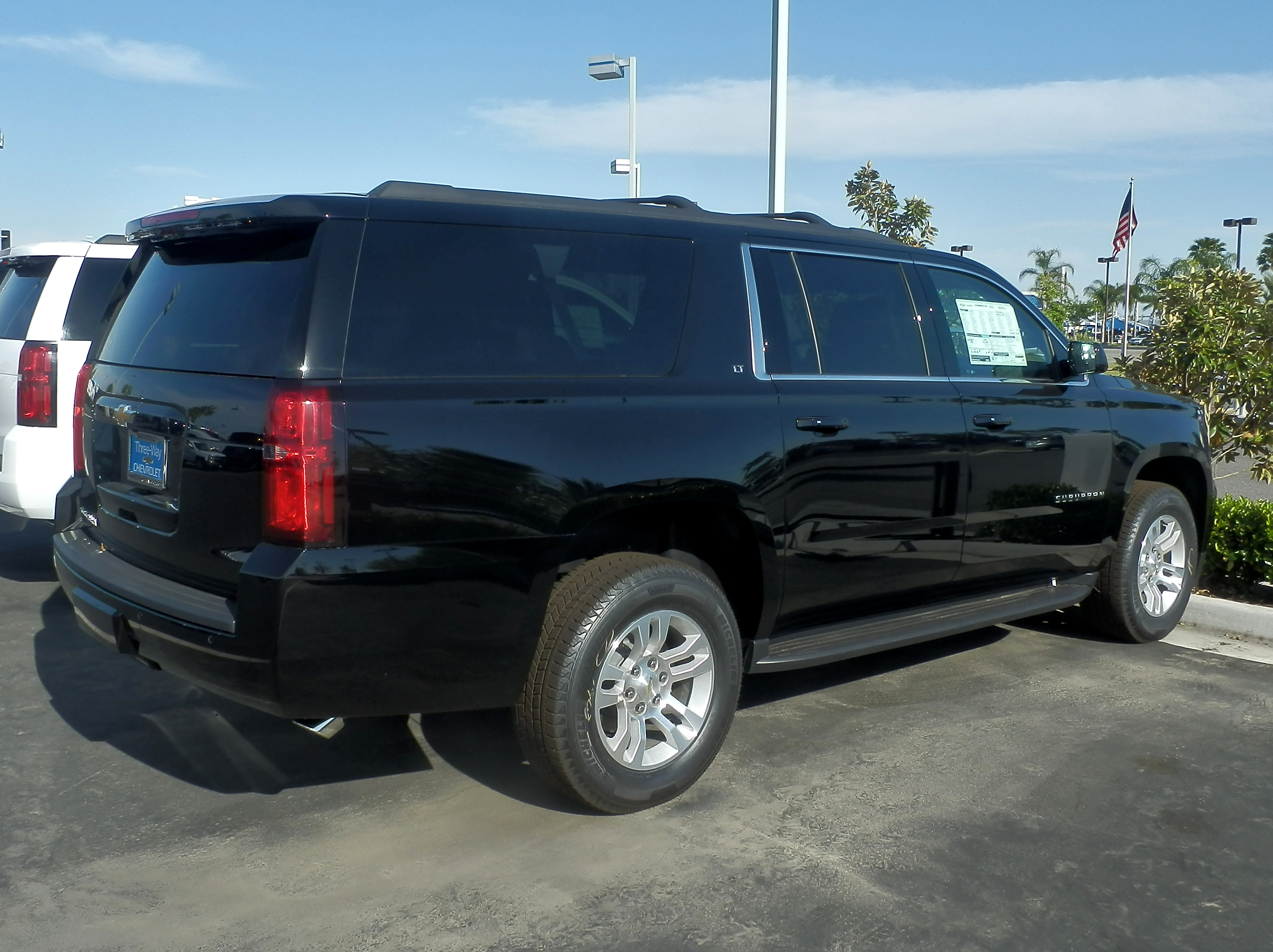
Rear view of Chevrolet Suburban

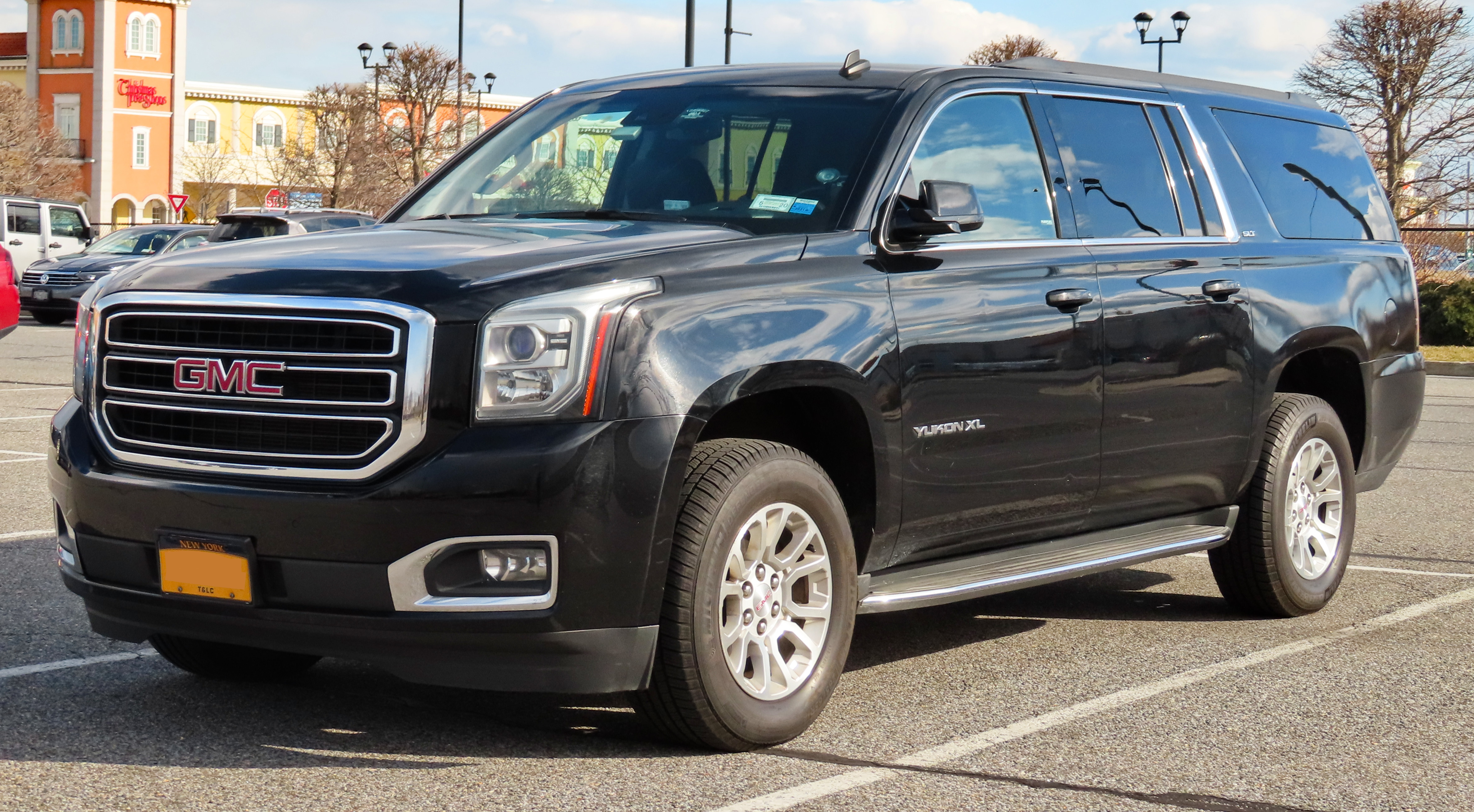
2015 GMC Yukon XL SLT

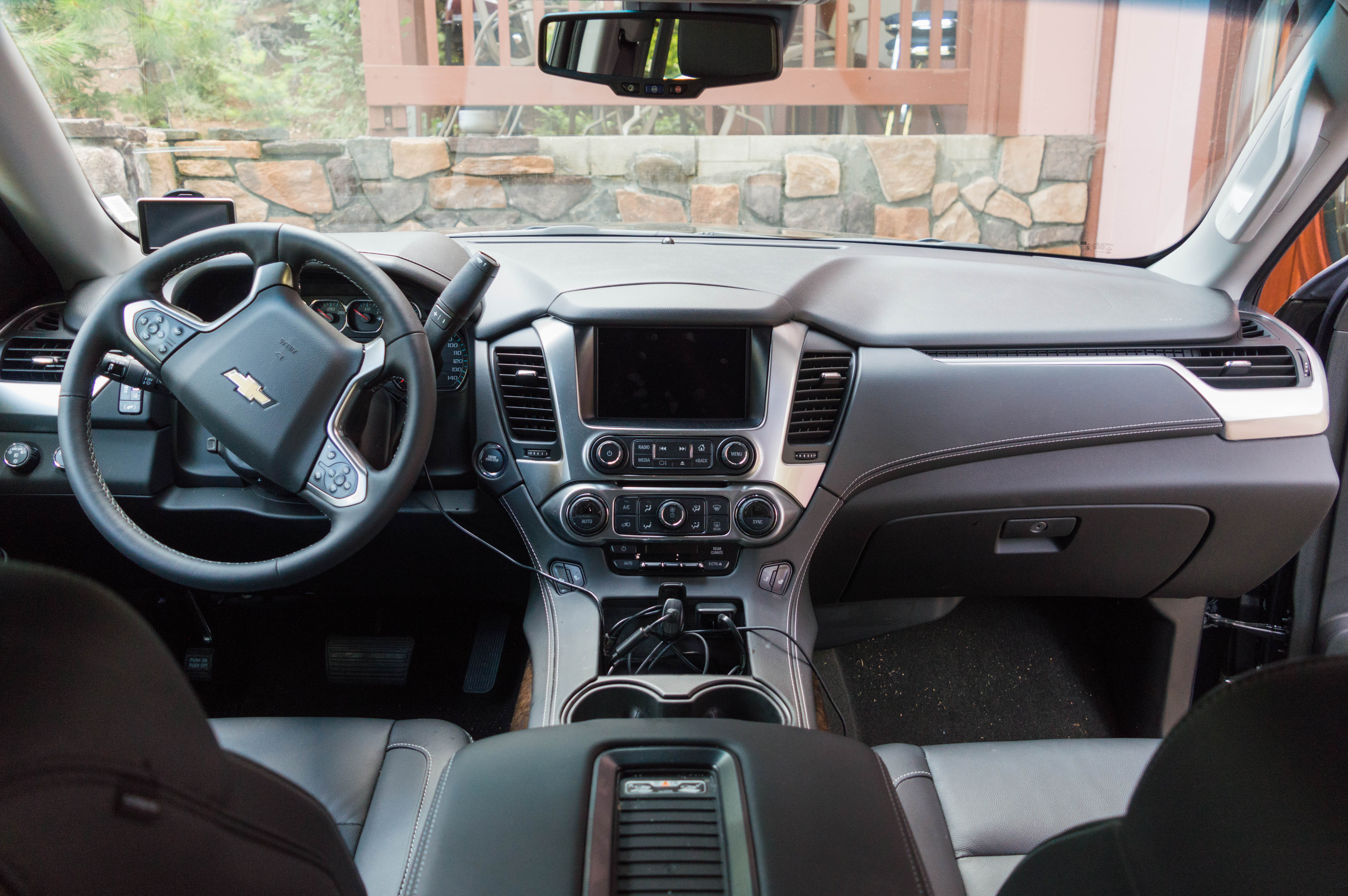
Interior (Chevrolet Suburban)

The eleventh generation Chevrolet Suburban, GMC Yukon XL, and Yukon Denali XL were introduced to the public on September 12, 2013; GM unveiled the vehicles in different locations (the Suburban in New York, Yukon XL in Los Angeles) on that date. Both vehicles are based on the GMT K2XX platform and carried specific model numbers, identified by platform (K2), brand (YC for Chevrolet, YG for GMC), drivetrain (C for 2WD; K for 4WD), tonnage (15 for half-ton, 25 for 3/4-ton, 35 for 1-ton), wheelbase (7 for short, 9 for long), and 06 for SUV, which means that a K2YC-K-15-9-06 would be identified as a Chevrolet Suburban 1500 4WD. The Suburban and Yukon XL went on sale in February 2014 as a 2015 model, with the vehicles built exclusively in Arlington, Texas.

=== Production details ===
The newly redesigned Suburban and Yukon XL were showcased to the public for the first time on September 27, 2013, at the State Fair of Texas. This move comes on the heels of the 80th anniversary of the first production of the Suburban in 1934.

The designs and concepts were created by GM's exterior design manager Chip Thole (before his transfer to GM's Buick design studio in 2013), who told Truck Trend magazine that "I start with what intuition tells me about the market and get the team going on that. You look at trends around the industry – fashion, culture, what people are buying, what they say they want now – and project that into the future. The fun part is putting those ideas to paper and going from there." He then added, "We wanted to take what was good about today's vehicles, bring that forward and make them new and different with that spark of freshness that people recognize, without making them gimmicky or overdone." Thole also challenged his design team to help bring ideas to the SUVs, which lead to the split headlamps and a more graphic feel for the Suburban design, while a more industrial but sculptured look was added to the Yukon XL to give it a unique identity of its own.

Production on the Suburban and Tahoe began in December 2013, with the first completed SUVs being used for testing purposes. GM then officially started shipping the vehicles to dealerships on February 5, 2014. It is estimated that it took 8–10 weeks to assemble the SUVs, save for the upgrades on the level trims and destination scheduling.

=== Features ===
The front fascia of the Chevy Suburban and GMC Yukon XL is distinct, but from the base of the A-pillars back, they share most of the same styling cues. This now includes inlaid doors that tuck into the door sills, instead of over them, improving aerodynamics, fuel economy, and lessens interior noise. The hoods and liftgate panels are made of aluminum to reduce vehicle weight, and the wiper blades that were located on the liftgate door were moved to the rear spoiler located on the top of the rear liftgate window. Also noticeable is the SUV's length, which expands from 222.4 to 224.4 in (5,649 to 5,700 mm) (the Yukon XL's length is shorter at 224.3 in (5,697 mm)) and its width from 79.1 to 80.5 in (2,009 to 2,045 mm), while the height decreases from 76.8 to 74.4 in (1,951 to 1,890 mm), thus allowing the vehicle to become slightly leaner, a little bit wider, more streamlined, and roomier.

A more efficient, direct-injected EcoTec3 V8 powertrain (5.3 for the Suburban, 6.2 for Yukon XL/Yukon Denali XL) coupled with improved aerodynamics, helped the SUVs offer greater estimated highway fuel economy and improving its fuel economy estimates to 16 mpg_{‑US} (15 L/100 km; 19 mpg_{‑imp}) (city), 23 mpg_{‑US} (10 L/100 km; 28 mpg_{‑imp}) (highway), and 18 mpg_{‑US} (13 L/100 km; 22 mpg_{‑imp}) (combined) for 2WD, and 15 mpg_{‑US} (16 L/100 km; 18 mpg_{‑imp}) (city), 22 mpg_{‑US} (11 L/100 km; 26 mpg_{‑imp}) (highway), and 18 mpg_{‑US} (13 L/100 km; 22 mpg_{‑imp}) (combined) for 4WD. The increased fuel economy also vaulted the Suburban/Yukon XL into the top spot among large SUVs with the most efficient fuel economy rating numbers for this segment. However, when Motor Trend (which placed the 2015 Suburban on the front cover of its June 2014 issue) did a road test review on the SUVs, it estimated the 4WD MPG on the Suburban LTZ to be slightly better at around 15.2 mpg_{‑US} (15.5 L/100 km; 18.3 mpg_{‑imp}) city and 22.3 mpg_{‑US} (10.5 L/100 km; 26.8 mpg_{‑imp}) highway, while the 4WD Yukon Denali XL, whose fuel economy (MPG) is rated at 14 mpg_{‑US} (17 L/100 km; 17 mpg_{‑imp}) city and 20 mpg_{‑US} (12 L/100 km; 24 mpg_{‑imp}) highway, was estimated lower at 12.4 mpg_{‑US} (19.0 L/100 km; 14.9 mpg_{‑imp}) city and 19.2 mpg_{‑US} (12.3 L/100 km; 23.1 mpg_{‑imp}) highway.

Like the 2007–14 version, both the Suburban and Yukon XL did not share a single piece of sheet metal or lighting element with the brands' full-size pickup trucks, and the front grilles of both vehicles were slightly altered to give it their own identity. The front headlights featured projector-beam headlamps flanking the Chevrolet-signature dual-port grille – chrome on all models, sweeping into the front fenders, while the Tahoe/Suburban LTZ and Yukon/XL Denali trims featured projector-beam high-intensity discharge headlamps and LED daytime running lamps. The Yukon and Yukon XL also featured projector-beam halogen headlamps on SLE and SLT trims. The improved safety features included a 360-degree radar detection for crash avoidance and occupant protection and a high-tech anti-theft system that now included vertical and interior sensors, in-glass and window breaking, a triggering alarm, and a shutdown device preventing the vehicle from moving. The latter was expected to address the issues regarding the constant thefts of the vehicles, especially with the previous generation's removable seats and items left in the cargo space, which has become a target for carjackers who see the third-row seats as valuable on the black market. According to General Motors' head of Global Vehicle Security Bill Biondo, "We have engineered a layered approach to vehicle security ... With new standard features and the available theft protection package, we are making the vehicles less attractive target to thieves and more secure for our customers."

Also new were the addition of fold-flat second and third-row seats (replacing the aforementioned removable third seats), which was now a standard feature but could be equipped with an optional power-folding feature for the upgraded trims, and an additional two inches of legroom for second-row passengers. HD radio became a standard feature on all trims. Multiple USB ports and power outlets were now spread throughout their interiors, including one 120 V three-prong outlet on both Suburban and Yukon XL, with the Suburban adding an available eight-inch color touch screen radio with next-generation MyLink connectivity along with an available rear-seat entertainment system with dual screens and Blu-ray DVD player, while the Yukon XL added a standard eight-inch-diagonal color touch screen radio with enhanced IntelliLink and available navigation. A 4G LTE WiFi access system, along with Siri Eyes Free and text messaging alerts, was included in all vehicles featuring the OnStar device around the second quarter of 2014.

=== Suburban HD ===
Suburban HD

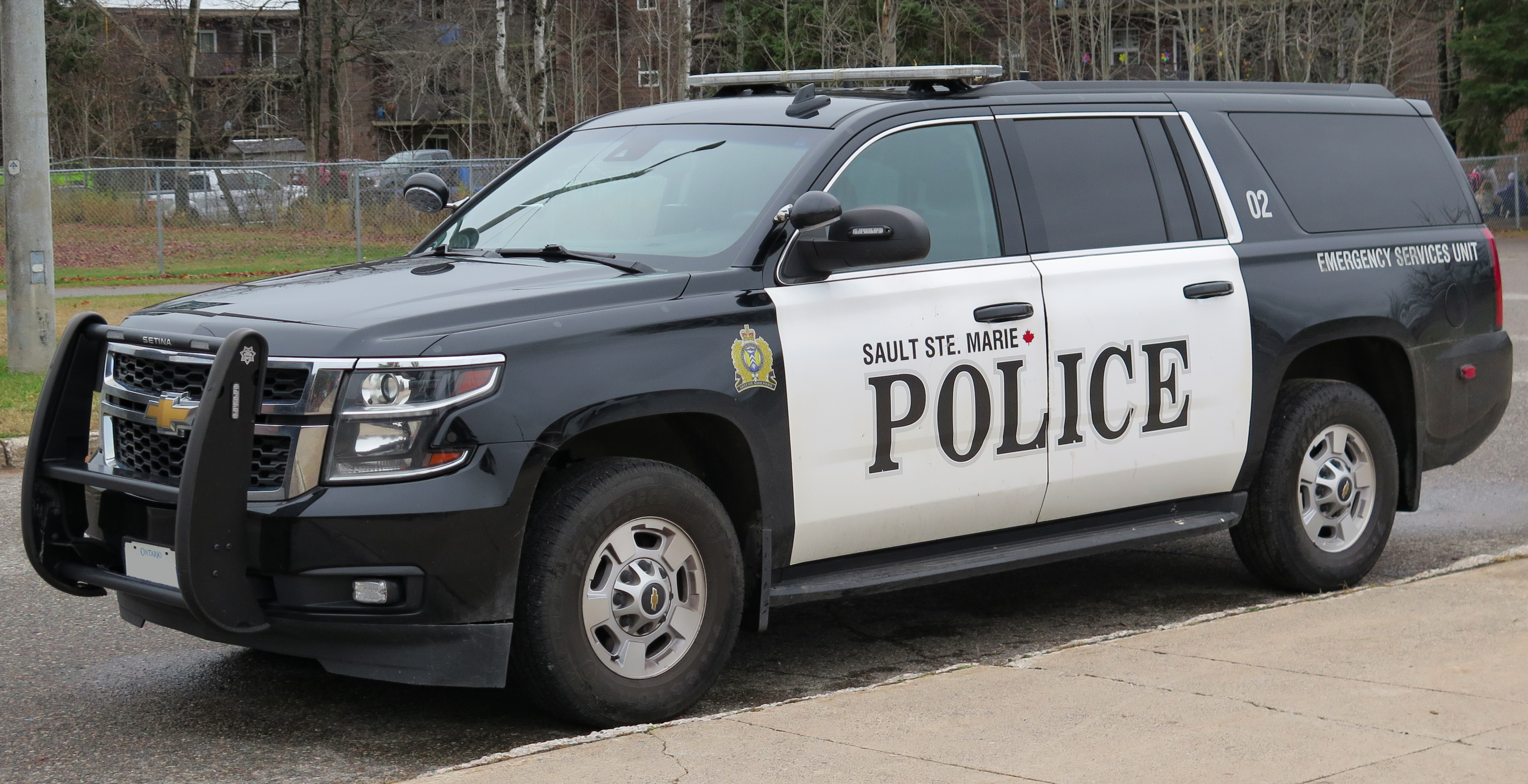
2018 Suburban K3500HD LS, distinguished by 8-bolt wheels; Sault Ste. Marie, Ontario, police

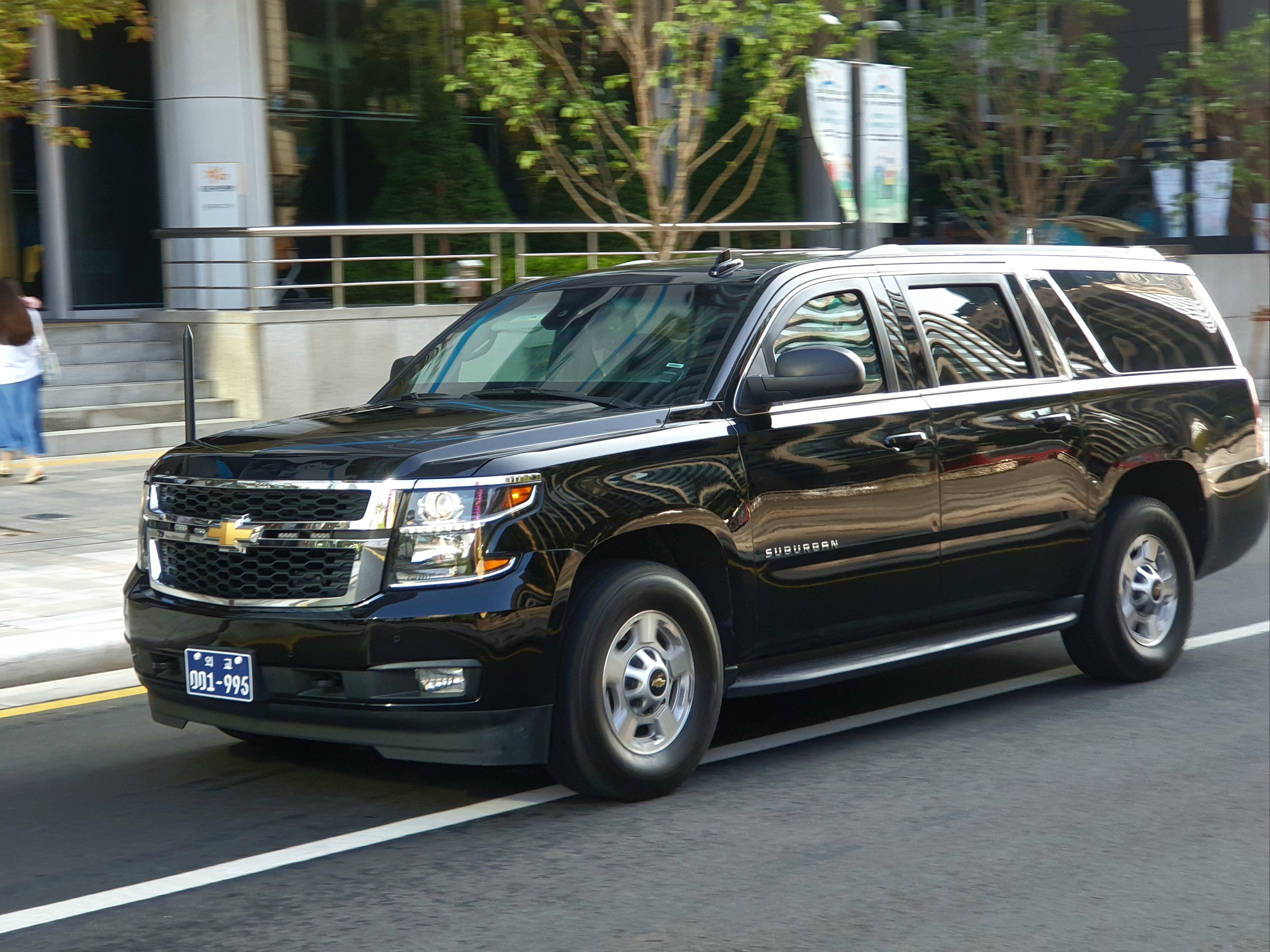
Suburban K3500HD LT, fitted with armor

With the change to the K2 platform, GM discontinued the 3/4-ton Suburban 2500; however, plans were revealed to offer a K2-based Suburban HD for fleet sales according to an updated VIN decoding document filed in March 2015. This version, identified as a Class 3 vehicle (around 10,000 to 14,000 pounds (4,500 to 6,400 kg) GVWR), was only available as a 4WD vehicle with the same design as the eleventh generation (K2XX), but was equipped with a different engine altogether. The Suburban HD was offered only in LS and LT trims, reserving the LTZ trim for a more luxurious offering (like limousine or taxi-related services). It also was not offered with 2WD or upgraded packages. In addition, there were no plans to offer a 3/4-ton GMC Yukon XL as GM made the design exclusive to Chevrolet.

The Suburban HD was officially named the "Suburban 3500HD," indicating a one-ton truck rating, and was introduced for the 2016 model year. This was available exclusively for fleet sales and equipped with the L96 6.0L V8 engine, 6L90 6-speed heavy-duty automatic transmission (RPO MYD), 17-inch machined aluminum wheels (8-lug), a high-capacity air cleaner, 220-amp alternator, external engine oil cooler, and auxiliary transmission cooler. The 3500HD did not include HD radio. Although the vehicle had a high GVWR of 11,000 lb (5,000 kg), it is intended to provide a larger payload but minimal towing capacity, as it primarily was intended for conversion to an armored transport.

The 2019 model year would be the last year for the K2-based Suburban HD; chassis production ceased in August 2018.

=== 2015 mid-year update ===
The Suburban added a hands-free power liftgate feature that is standard on the LTZ but included on the LT with the optional Luxury Package. The added 4G LTE WiFi and Siri features became standard on both LT and LTZ trims, while the MyLink with Navigation feature was upgraded from optional to standard on the LTZ trim. The E85 capability feature is removed from retail orders.

The Yukon XL's 6.2-liter EcoTec3 V8 engine was updated with the new 8L90E eight-speed automatic transmission for the interim model year, allowing it to improve fuel economy. The Yukon XL Denali, however, saw its MSRP bumped up by $1,300 (~$1,723 in 2025) in part because of the loaded features.

All GM full-sized SUVs received a body-colored painted Shark Fin antenna as part of the 2015 mid-year refresh.

This refresh is often referred to as the 2015i, "i" for interim processing code.

=== 2016 ===
For the 2016 model year (which commenced sales in July 2015), the Chevrolet Suburban received more upgraded changes and new features that included power-adjustable pedals, forward collision alert, IntelliBeam headlamps, lane keep assist, and a safety alert seat as part of the newly introduced enhanced driver alert package as an available option on the LS trim. The inside floor console with storage area-SD card reader was removed, while a new AM/FM audio integrated system with Sirius XM, HD Radio, and CD/MP3 capabilities was introduced as a standard feature on all trims; the 8-inch MyLink feature was expanded to the LS trim and became standard (replacing the 4-inch display), although the navigation feature remained as an option on LT and standard on LTZ. A new liftgate shield was added to the Theft Protection Package, along with the new lane keep assist which replaced the lane departure warning. The capless fuel fill tanks became standard on all trims. Siren Red Tintcoat and Iridescent Pearl Tricoat became the new color trims, replacing Crystal Red Tintcoat and White Diamond Tricoat. The instrument cluster was re-configured with a new multi-color enhancement and a heads-up display was introduced as a standard only on the LTZ trim. The 2016 models also saw a price hike as well.

The 2016 GMC Yukon XL also sees similar changes, with the new enhanced driver alert package as an available option on the SLE trim, liftgate, power, hands-free now packaged on SLT trims, a free-flow feature that replaced the Premium package, a lane keep assist added to all trims, and two new premium colors (Crimson Red Tintcoat and White Frost Tricoat) replacing Crystal Red Tintcoat and White Diamond Tricoat respectively.

Chevrolet added Apple CarPlay and Android Auto Capability features to the Suburban starting with the 2016 models. However, only one of their phone brands at any one time can be used, while the Android Auto option was only available on LT and LTZ trims featuring 8-inch screens.

GM expanded newer 4G LTE features (like detecting battery failure and monitoring insurance discounts based on driver performance) to 2016 model year vehicles, including the Suburban, which GM cited as being the vehicle that is the most used among data subscribers.

=== 2017 ===
The 2017 model year Chevrolet Suburban received upgraded changes after it went on sale in August 2016. The level trims LS and LT are retained but the LTZ is renamed Premier, the latter serving as the equivalent to the Yukon XL Denali. The LS trims also saw the badged "LS" lettering removed. The new features include two new colors (Blue Velvet Metallic and Pepperdust Metallic), two new 22-inch wheel options (a 7-spoke Silver wheels with Chrome inserts for all trims; Ultra Bright machined aluminum wheels with Bright Silver finish for Premier trim only), black roof rack cross rails (as part of the Texas Edition Package and All-Season Package), front active aero shutters (all trims), and heated and vented seats (Premier trim only). The MyLink was updated to incorporate Teen Driver, App Shop, Rear Seat Reminder customization, and Low-Speed Forward Automatic Braking (as part of Enhanced Driver Alert Package on the LS trim, but standard on LT and Premier). The Rear Seat Entertainment System was overhauled to include a new video voiceover feature for the visually and hearing impaired, an HDMI/MHL connector, digital headphones, Digital Living Network Alliance (DLNA) technology incorporated into the Wi-Fi system, and a second USB port with the capability of charging up to a 2.1-amp at the back of the console.

The 2017 model year Yukon XL also received similar changes, but with a few exceptions. Two new colors, Dark Blue Sapphire Metallic and Mineral Metallic were introduced, the latter exclusive to the Denali, which also added a new 22-inch ultra-bright aluminum wheels with midnight silver premium paint and a head-up display to its features. The interior backlights changed from red to blue. The heated and vented driver and front passenger seats became standard on the SLT and Denali trims.

=== 2018 ===
The 2018 model year Suburban had a few upgrades and deletions. LED daytime running lights became standard on all trims, along with a new color, Havana Metallic and Satin Steel Metallic. The Cocoa/Mahogany interior that was combined with the Pepperdust Metallic exterior was dropped along with the wireless/inductive phone charging that was part of the Luxury and Texas Edition LT level trims. The fleet/commercial level trim, which had fewer features, was upgraded to include MyLink, HD Radio, multi-color driver information center, LED daytime running lights, and an optional driver alert package.

The 2018 Yukon Denali XL received a new grille with a layered appearance like the ones on its redesigned 2018 Acadia and Terrain brands, featuring high-intensity-discharge headlights and LED daytime running lights. The refreshed design provided better airflow to the radiator, and when less cooling air is needed, shutters behind the grille closed to improve aerodynamics and efficiency. The interior featured new ash wood trim that, according to GMC, gave the cabin a richer appearance. A new 10-speed automatic transmission was mated to its 420-horsepower (313 kW; 426 PS), 6.2-liter V8 engine, replacing the 8-speed transmission.

=== 2019 ===
The 2019 Suburban will have both Havana Metallic and Tungsten Metallic deleted in favor of a new Shadow Gray Metallic exterior color, while the top-of-the-line Premier now had the name displayed on the tailgate. The LS trim continued to make HD Radio a standard feature, but could be deleted if customers opted for the OnStar feature.

The 2019 model year GMC Yukon XL added three new exterior colors, Dark Sky Metallic, Pepperdust Metallic, and Smokey Quartz Metallic, while deleting two others, Mineral Metallic and Iridium Metallic. GMC also introduced two new package features, Graphite Edition and Graphite Performance Edition, which were available in the SLT trim only.

=== 2020 ===
The 2020 Chevrolet Suburban dropped the LT Signature Package and the LS All-Season Package, along with the Pepperdust Metallic color, while the 2020 GMC Yukon XL replaced its Pepperdust Metallic color with Carbon Black Metallic and made no additional changes.

=== Accolades ===
The 2015 Suburban was ranked third among the top affordable SUVs and fifth among affordable SUVs with 3-row seats by U.S. News & World Report, and was among the finalists in Motor Trend's SUV of the year for 2015. It also received a 2015 MotorWeek Drivers' Choice Award for best large SUV, while Consumer Reports ranked the Suburban as the best SUV with a third row seat, topping its competitors in this category.

The Chevrolet Suburban took third place behind the Tahoe and GMC Yukon in the 2016 J.D. Power Vehicle Dependability Study among full-size SUVs, based on responses from owners of the vehicles.

Good Housekeeping named the 2018 Suburban the "Best New Car of Year 2018" in the Large SUV category. Consumer Reports added the 2018 Suburban to their recommended list due to high owner satisfaction scores.

The Suburban was given a Hollywood Walk of Fame star on December 5, 2019, one of two inanimate objects to be awarded such (Disneyland being the other), for its frequent appearances in film and television. Because city regulations prohibit placing corporate names on public sidewalks including the Walk of Fame, the star was instead placed in an area adjacent to the Walk of Fame.

=== Sales ===
The eleventh-generation Suburban saw an increase in sales; April 2014 brought a 109.8 percent spike, with most dealers reporting that the vehicles are being sold within 10 days after arriving on the lot, with customers opting for the fully loaded LTZ model, making it one of Chevrolet's fastest selling brands in 2014. The eleventh generation Suburban is also a hot seller in the Middle East, where in August 2014 posted a 37% increase in sales, with most of the purchases coming from Saudi Arabia (65%), the United Arab Emirates (15%) and Qatar (108%). By the end of September 2014, GM sold more than 4101 units of the Suburban (up 50.1%), while the Yukon XL posted 2165 units sold (up 64%), with GM boasting that 80% of the vehicles sold were its large SUVs.

In Canada, sales of the Suburban reached 966 units (up 43%) in 2014, although the Yukon XL was the best seller in that country with 1,760 vehicles sold (up 50.3%) that same year. Overall, they accounted for 70 percent of GM Canada's SUV sales for 2014.

On August 17, 2015, GM confirmed plans to increase production on its large SUVs, especially on the Suburban/Yukon XL, citing lower gas prices and a higher demand for the vehicles. The move also resulted in its Arlington Assembly adding more hours and increasing its production from 48,000 SUVs to 60,000 based on the expanding hours and added Saturday overtime shifts.

The 2017 MY Suburban saw its biggest sales increase in January 2017, when it posted a 72.3% gain (5,634 units), the most ever since January 2008 when it had the 2008 MY Suburban.

== Twelfth generation (2021) ==
GMT1YC/YG
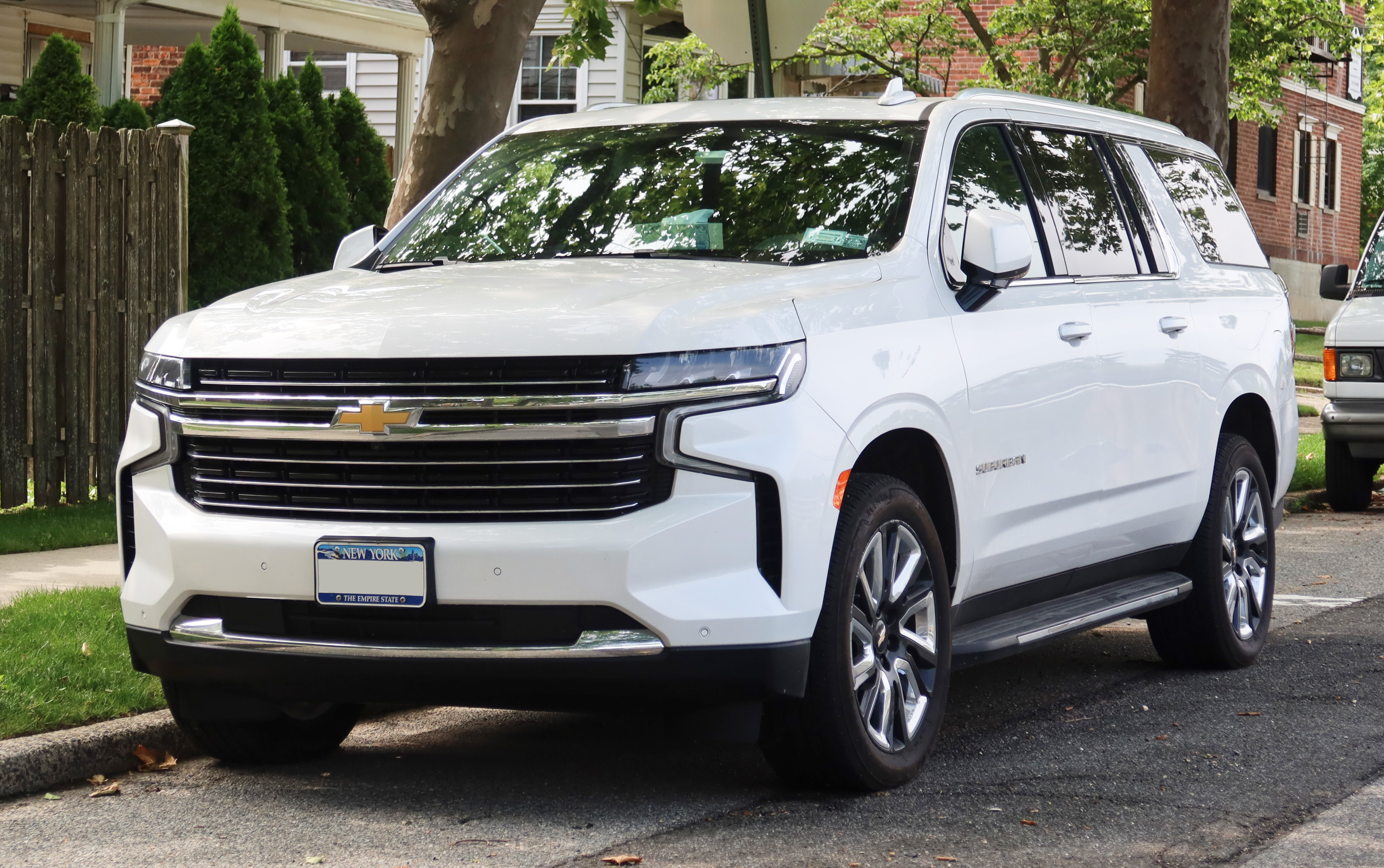
- 2021 Chevrolet Suburban LT

Overview
- Also called: GMC Yukon XL; Cadillac Escalade ESV (2021–)
- Production: July 2020–present
- Model years: 2021–present
- Assembly: Arlington, Texas, U.S. (Arlington Assembly)

Body and chassis
- Layout: Front engine, rear-wheel drive / four-wheel drive
- Platform: GMT T1XX
- Related: Cadillac Escalade; Chevrolet Tahoe/GMC Yukon

Powertrain
- Engine: 5.3 L (325 cu in) EcoTec3 V8 FlexFuel; 6.2 L (376 cu in) EcoTec3 V8 FlexFuel; 3.0 L LM2 Duramax I6 turbodiesel (except 2021–2024 Z71 and Mexico-export version)
- Transmission: 10-speed Hydra-Matic 10L80 automatic

Dimensions
- Wheelbase: 134.1 in (3,406 mm)
- Length: Suburban: 225.7 in (5,733 mm); Yukon XL: 225.4 in (5,725 mm)
- Width: 81.1 in (2,060 mm)
- Height: 75.7 in (1,923 mm)
- Curb weight: 5,785–5,993 lb (2,624–2,718 kg)

On December 10, 2019, Chevrolet introduced the twelfth-generation Suburban at Little Caesars Arena in Detroit, Michigan. This time around, GM chose to introduce the Chevrolet full-size SUVs first. The GMC Yukon XL was later introduced on January 14, 2020. Although the fifth-generation Cadillac Escalade made its debut on February 4, 2020, its extended length sibling Escalade ESV was the last GM full-size SUV to be introduced online in April 2020 after it was withdrawn from the cancelled 2020 New York International Auto Show. Originally scheduled to start in April 2020, due to the COVID-19 recession, GM postponed production of the Suburban to 13 July, 2020. The Suburban began entering dealerships in August 2020.

=== Chevrolet Suburban ===
==== 2021 ====
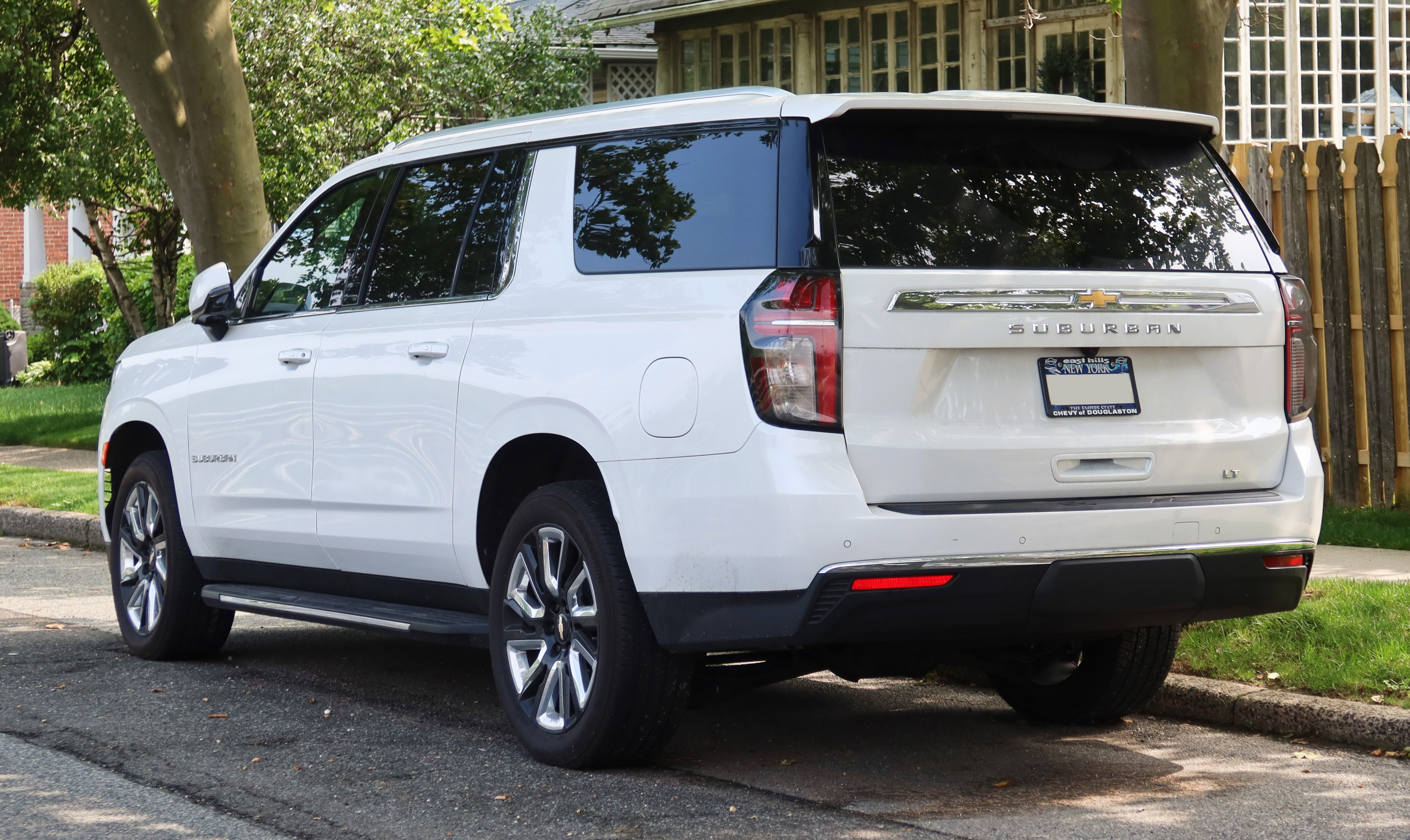
Rear view

Based on the same GMT T1XX platform as the Silverado 1500, the Suburban distinguished itself by swapping that truck's live axle and leaf springs for an independent rear multilink suspension setup with coil springs, thus lowering the floor of the vehicle and creating more room, in both the cargo area and the second- and third-row seats. The Suburban expanded its length to 225.7 inches (5,733 mm), and the wheelbase to 134.1 inches (3,406 mm) while shortening down by 15 inches (381 mm) longer than the Tahoe (as its wheelbase was moved back by 5 inches (127 mm)), making it the largest and longest SUV in the extended-length segment. It gains two cubic feet (57 L) of cargo space behind the third row and 2.2 inches (56 mm) of third-row legroom. The towing capabilities were increased with the twelfth-generation models.

The trims feature the primary basic LS, LT, and Premier levels, with the 4WD-exclusive Z71 and RST moving from package to premium levels, along with the newly added High Country level, the latter being the top of the line. Chevrolet rolled out the LT, Z71, Premier, and High Country levels first, with the LS and RST levels arriving in late Fall 2020.

Quad exhaust tailpipes are added to the vehicle, giving it a more unique look, although this feature is only standard on Premier and High Country. This feature isn't offered on the LS, LT, Z71 and RST because of their configuration as regular base, off-road, and street-centric level trims respectively, nor on all trims with a Duramax option. The RST Suburban, which had photos released in April 2020, has a unique fascia and a sportier design similar to its Cadillac Escalade ESV Sport level trim. Both Premier and High Country trims have power-retractable assist steps that was optional on the Premier trim from the previous generation.

Although it retained a boxy look, it added a more curvaceous design with this change and adopted the same Chevrolet design language featuring the front grille and distinct LED lighting that is also used on the Silverado, save for the black-grilled Z71 (without the bumper) and RST. The tailgate is more front and center, with the signature "Suburban" name stretched across it. A combination of sheet metal and aluminum was used to ensure a more lightweight vehicle.

The dashboard and entertainment system have been fleshed out, moving away from the traditional design. Newly updated features include a 10.25-inch touch screen that is now standard on all trims, and a pair of 12.6-inch LCD rear screens that can play movies and offer content from passengers' smartphones and can play different programs on the two screens. A new push-button shifter column (P, R, N, D) is placed on the dashboard. Nine camera displays for enhanced towing capabilities and a total of 30 additional safety features have been implemented throughout the Suburban. An Air Ride Adaptive Suspension is standard on the higher trims, likewise with an 8-inch driver screen. Another new feature, a power sliding console that became available in late Summer 2020. The High Country Suburban also has a Deluxe package option with advance features that is exclusive to this trim only. The 40/20/40 front seat option that was available on the LS trim is now exclusive to fleet orders with this generation using the same base trim.

The Suburban also featured a Duramax diesel engine as an option (available on all trims and packages except for the Z71) for the first time, and so far the only brand outside its competitors to have this option; a 3.0-liter I6 is used which produces 277 horsepower (207 kW; 281 PS) and 460 lb⋅ft (624 N⋅m; 64 kg⋅m) of torque. The 6.2-liter EcoTec engine that was reserved for the RST trim in the previous generation is exclusive to the High Country level trim. The engine choices added up to improved fuel economy numbers, albeit with an increased MPG for city and a decreased MPG for highway. GM has no plans to offer this model in a 2500 or 3500 series version.

==== 2022 ====
For the 2022 model year, the Suburban saw an increased availability of the 6.2-liter V-8, which continues to be standard on High Country but can now be fitted to the RST, Z71, and Premier trim levels, and expands the Magnetic Ride Control damping system to the RST. The 12.3-inch screen (with Google Assistant, Google Maps, and the Google Play Store embedded) becomes standard on the higher trims except for the LS. A newly optional electronic limited-slip differential is now available on the Z71 trim and can be used in the 4WD Low setting.

==== 2025 refresh ====
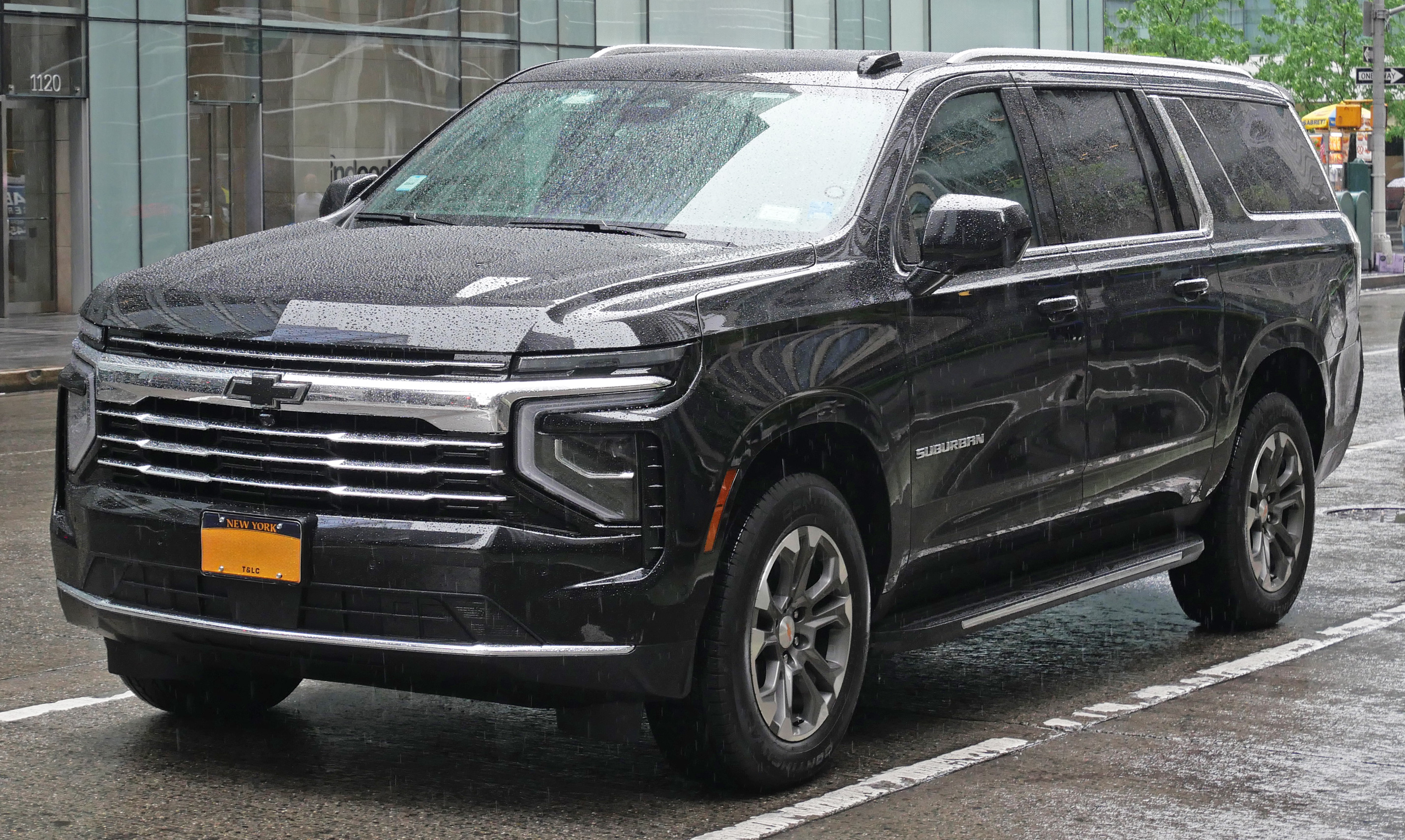
Front view

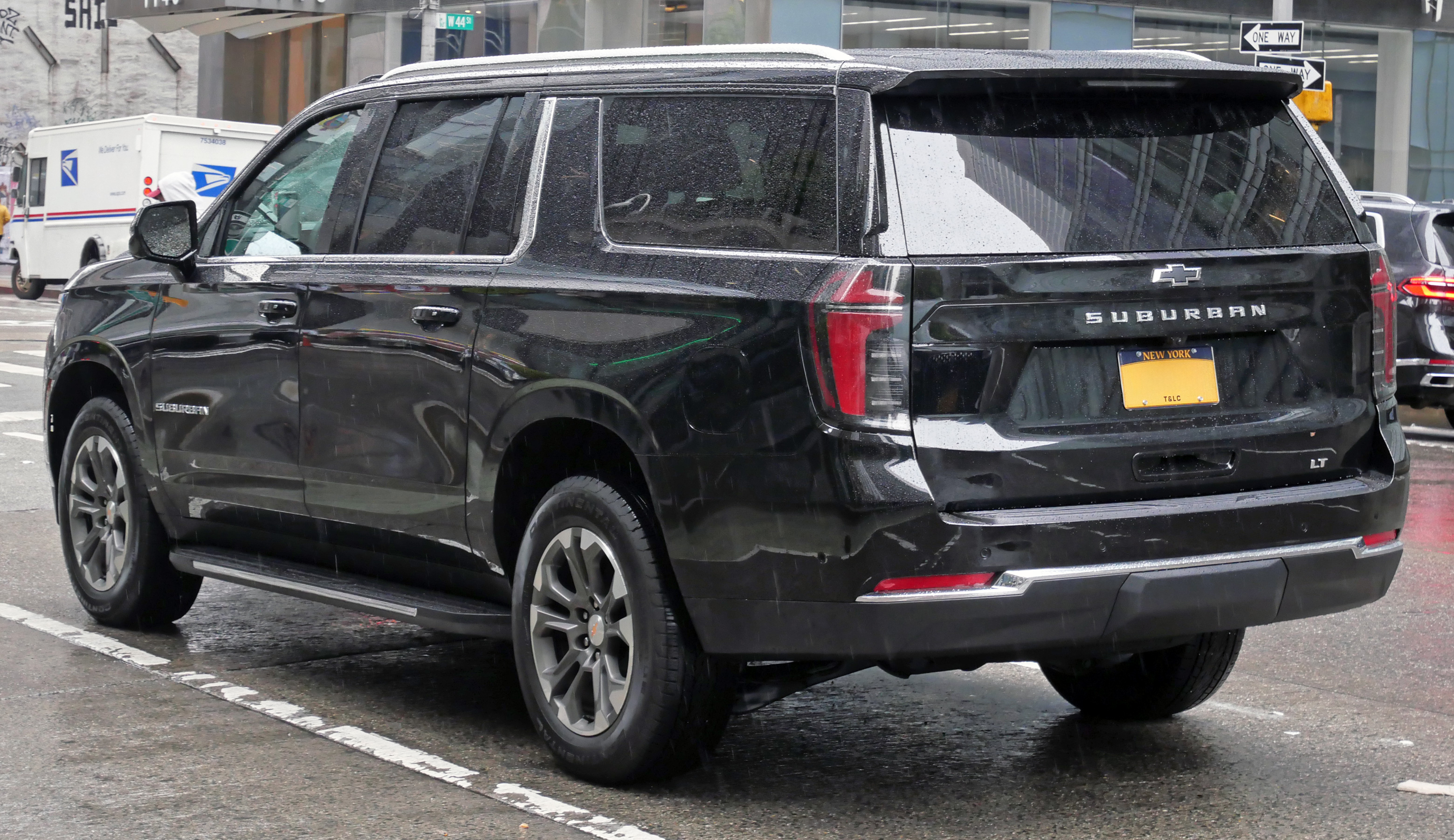
Rear View

On November 29, 2023, GM unveiled a refresh for both the Suburban and Tahoe models. The Suburban features a refreshed front and rear fascia with redesigned headlights and taillights similar to those from the 3rd-generation 2024 Chevrolet Traverse. Other changes include new 24-inch wheels, a new upgraded 3.0L Duramax diesel engine option with 10 percent more horsepower than the outgoing option (thus now being available on the Z71 trim level for the first time), a new revised interior with an all-new standard 17.7-inch-diagonal freeform infotainment screen paired with the 11-inch-diagonal driver information center and redesigned center console, new ride and handling enhancements, upgraded safety and technology including GM Super Cruise, and improved towing and trailering technology. The refreshed models will go on sale in late 2024 for the 2025 model year.

=== Yukon XL ===
==== 2021 ====
GMC unveiled its twelfth generation Yukon XL in Vail, Colorado on January 14, 2020, alongside its short-wheelbase sibling Yukon. Like the Suburban, the Yukon XL also featured an independent rear suspension, a 3.0-liter inline-six turbodiesel engine, and a top-shelf suspension option featuring air springs and magnetic-ride shocks, a standard 5.3-liter V8, an optional 420-horsepower (313 kW; 426 PS) 6.2-liter V8, and a 10-speed automatic transmission that is standard across the lineup. It also gained 4.1 inches (104 mm) in the wheelbase but only 0.9 inches (23 mm) in overall length, making it still short of the Suburban's length. The dashboard has two versions, one identical to the Suburban while a different one with a larger entertainment screen is exclusive to the Denali. The Yukon XL's design follows GMC's design language, with the front grille mimicking the Sierra but the tailgate mimicking the GMC crossover SUV lineup with the lights extended to the tailgate doors.

The lineup of level trims also expanded as well, with the SLE, SLT, and Denali now joined by the 4WD-exclusive AT4, the latter of which comes standard with the Magnetic Ride Control electronically adaptive dampers, AT4-exclusive leather-appointed seats, and stitching with a unique Jet Black interior color and Brandy accents, a heated steering wheel, heated and ventilated front seats, heated second-row outboard seats, a two-speed transfer case, 20-inch Goodyear all-terrain tires, Traction Select System with off-road mode, hill descent control, and skid plates. The Denali level offers three packages for this generation, with Deluxe joining the Premium and Ultimate options, and became the only trim to offer quad exhaust tailpipes.

==== 2022 ====
For the 2022 model year, the Yukon XL added a few additions similar to the Suburban, among them a 12.3-inch digital gauge cluster that is now standard on all trims, with Google Assistant, Google Maps and the Google Play Store embedded. The power sliding center console is now standard on the Denali trim. Redwood Metallic is added as a new color option.

==== 2025 facelift ====
The twelfth-generation GMC Yukon XL received a facelift for the 2025 model year. The facelift includes a redesigned front fascia with redesigned LED headlights and LED taillights similar to those from the 3rd-generation 2024 GMC Acadia. Other changes include the Elevation trim level being introduced to replace the SLE and SLT trim levels as the entry-level trim, the deletion of the nine passenger seating configuration with 1st row bench seating (which was an available seating option exclusive to the SLE and SLT trim levels on the pre-facelift version of the twelfth-generation GMC Yukon XL), the introduction of the Denali Ultimate and AT4 Ultimate trim levels, new towing technology, and the same upgraded Duramax Diesel engine output seen on the 2025 Suburban. The facelifted twelfth-generation Yukon XL entered production in November 2024. The smallest wheel size is 20 inch, including on the offroad focused AT4 trim.

T1XX (12th generation) Suburban/Yukon

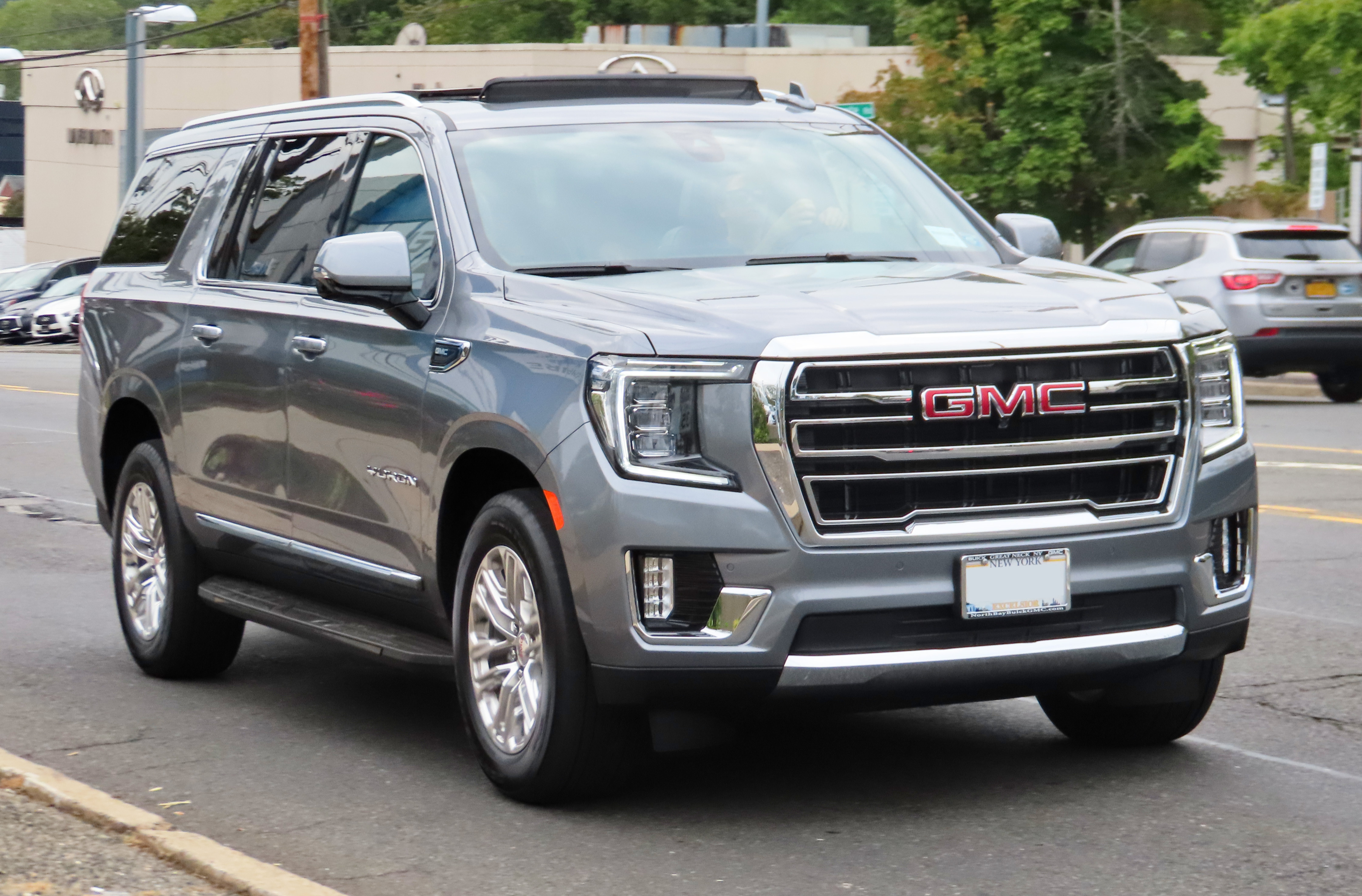
2021 GMC Yukon XL

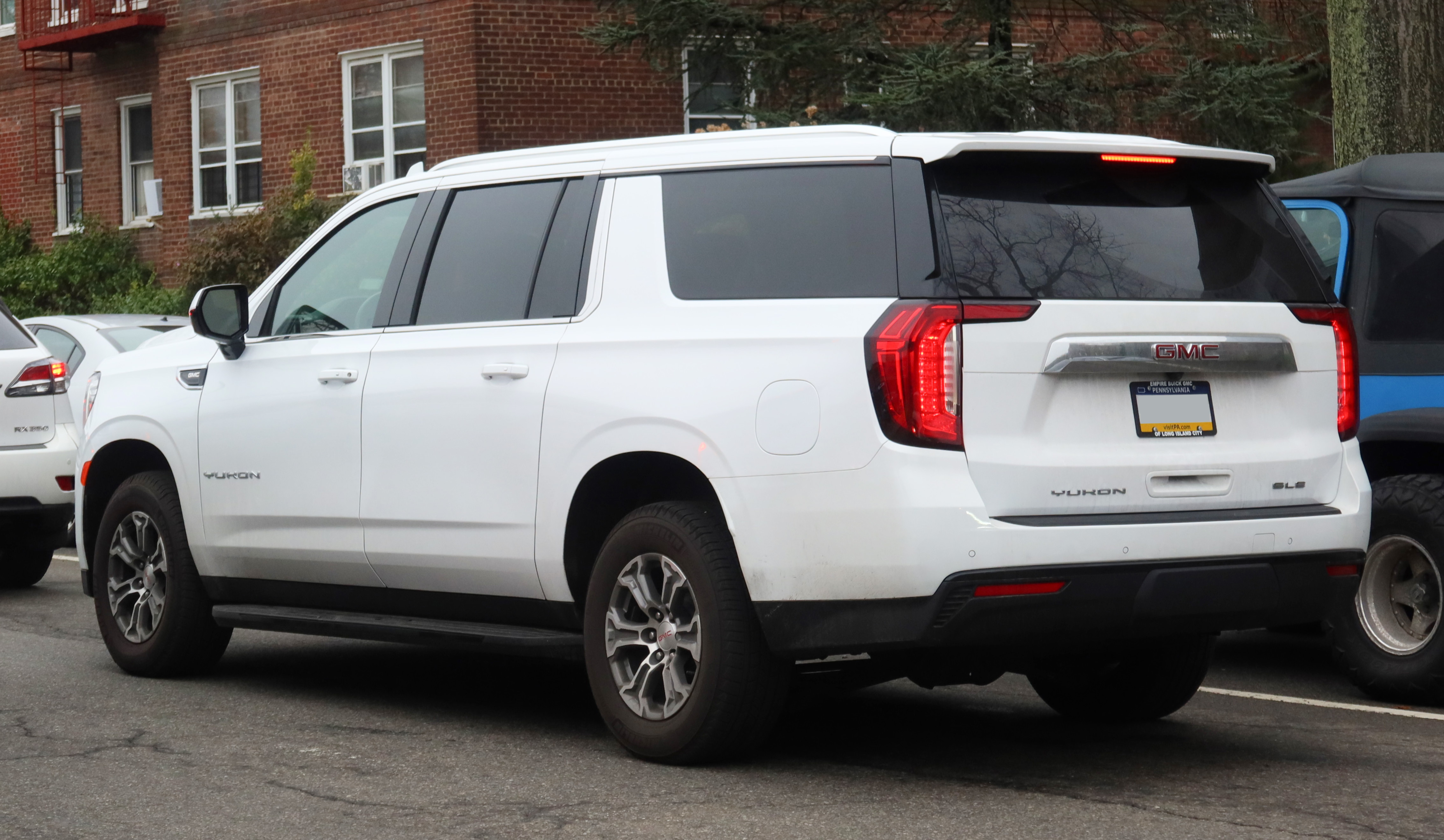
Rear view

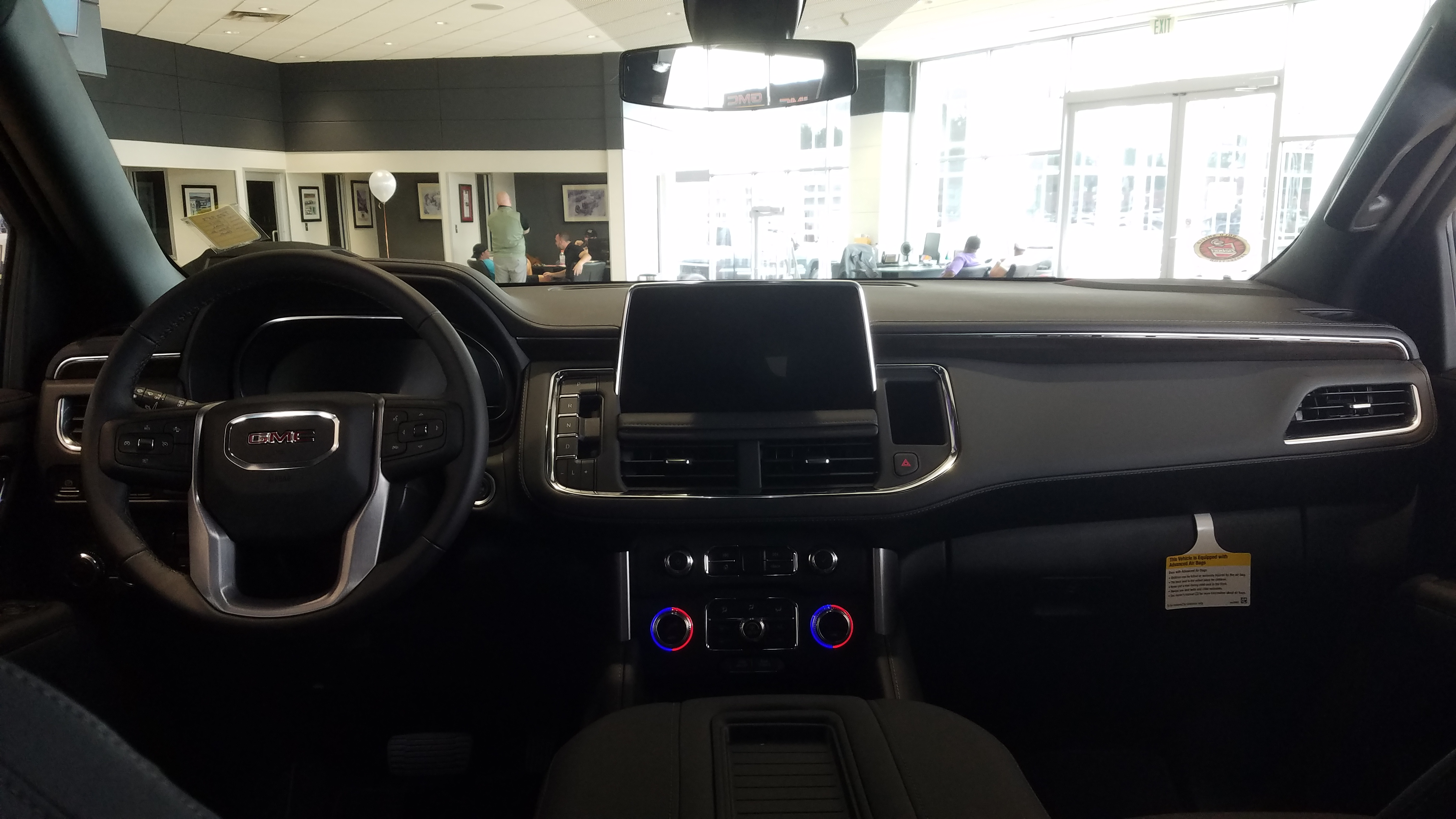
Interior (standard)

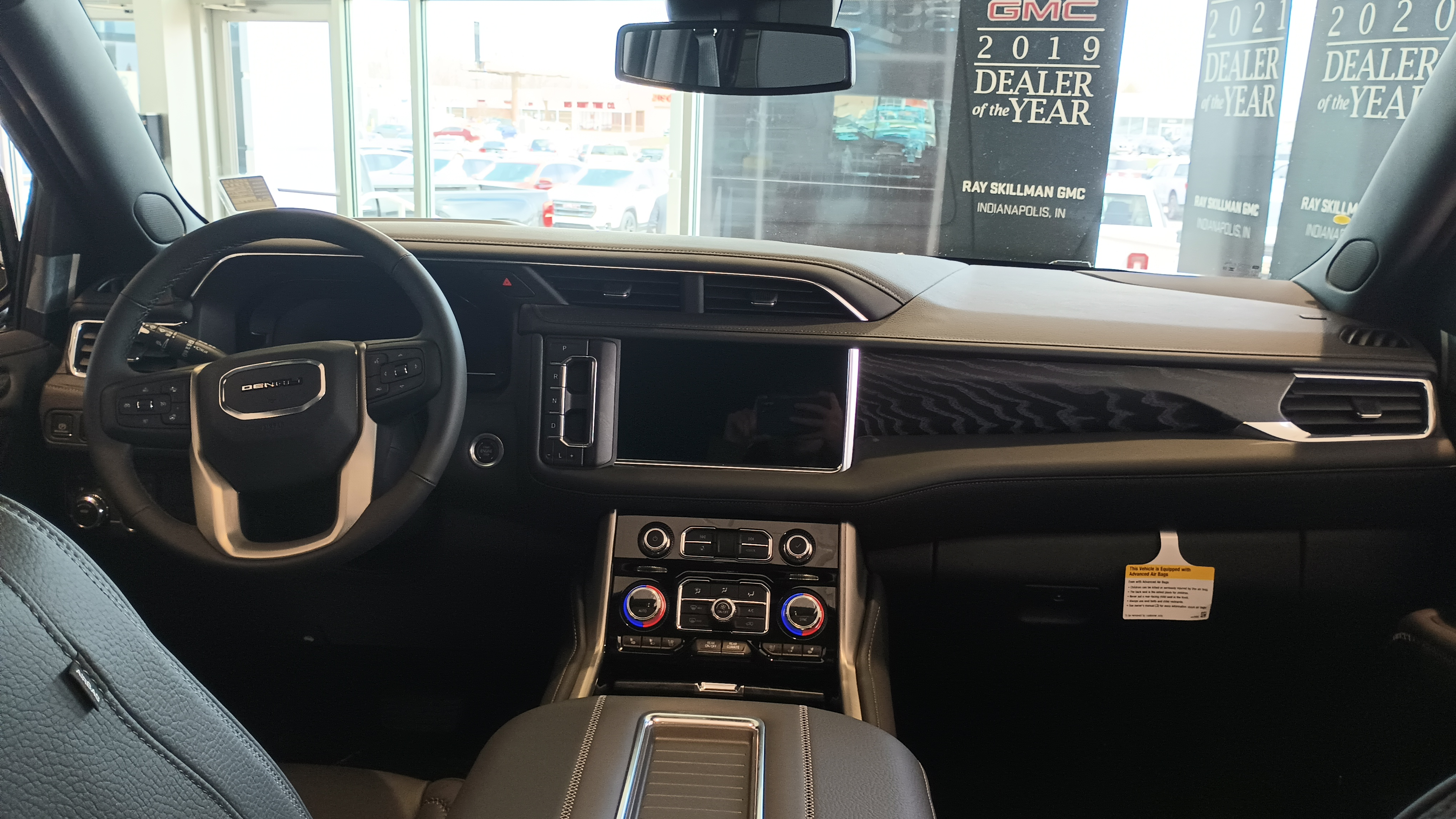
Interior (Denali)

=== Suburban Shield / HD SUV ===
In 2021, GM Defense was awarded a $36.4 million contract by the United States Department of State Diplomatic Security Service (DSS) for ten GMT T1XX-based prototype Suburban HD vehicles, with uprated suspension and an undisclosed powertrain; deliveries were scheduled for Spring 2023. The first prototype was shown to DSS leadership during a ride-and-drive event held at Summit Point Raceway on June 29, 2023. Under the terms of the contract, one prototype will be tested for survivability by shooting it with small arms and detonating small blasts; the other prototypes will be tested for durability.

The vehicle is named the Suburban Shield and was known as the Heavy-Duty Sport Utility Vehicle (HD SUV) during development. It is offered in 1LT and 2LT trims with 4WD and the L87 6.2L V8 engine and 10-speed automatic transmission standard; the 3.0L Duramax I-6 turbodiesel is an option. The primary differences between the trims is the seating configuration, with the 1LT featuring second and third row bench seats, which are captain's chairs and jump seats, respectively, for the 2LT. The chassis is designated "eBOF" (Electric Body on Frame) and can accommodate a diverse set of powertrains, including battery electric and hydrogen fuel cell. Armor is integrated during the initial build, rather than having a finished vehicle torn down and reassembled by an aftermarket upfitter. Although many components and systems are shared with the commercial T1XX Suburban, including the body, exterior, interior, powertrain, and brakes, the chassis and frame are specific to the HD SUV to accommodate the increased weight; the chassis is based on the Silverado HD ZR2.

GM Defense was awarded an indefinite delivery, indefinite quantity contract in November 2023 with a ceiling value of US$300 million; serial production is scheduled to commence in June 2024, resulting in up to 2,000 Shields being delivered over 10 years. It is assembled at a new GM Defense facility in Concord, North Carolina, near Charlotte Motor Speedway. The first regular production Shield was completed in October 2024.

=== Availability ===
For international regions, Chevrolet started selling the twelfth generation Suburban in Mexico in August 2020, but unlike the United States and Canada, Mexico only offered the Suburban in the LT, RST, and High Country trims; the LS, Z71, and Premier level trims and the Duramax option are not offered for that country. The American-built models will use the GM 10-speed automatic transmission with Electronic Precision Shift technology, manufactured at the GM Silao Complex in the state of Guanajuato in central Mexico. The Philippines began selling the 2021–present Suburban (with a possibility that it would offer a Duramax engine option in the country should Chevrolet make it available) in fall 2020, followed by the Middle East region. In November 2020, GM announced that their large SUV lineup would be imported to China, marking the Suburban's maiden entry into the country, starting with the 12th generation models. GM put those plans on hold in February 2021, citing the difficulty of having an import sold alongside its Chinese-built offerings, the makeup of the facilities that would be required to assemble the large full-size SUVs, and concerns that the full-size SUVs would not be able to comply with China's emission standards, as well as concerns that China's internal combustion engine excise taxes imposed on all vehicles sold in China that are powered by ICE engines more than 3.0 liters will hurt sales of GM's large full-size SUVs in the East Asian country.

A right-hand-drive version of Suburban for Australia and right-hand-drive markets to be done by Holden Special Vehicles (HSV), which was announced in December 2019, is on hold, citing the low demand, capacity issues at HSV, and highly competitive large luxury SUV and towing market in Australia, although that could change due to GM's partnership with HSV to bring more American vehicles like the Suburban back down under the newly announced General Motors Specialty Vehicles (GMSV) arrangement.

The Yukon XL officially went on sale for the first time ever in Mexico, starting in the Fall of 2020 with the 2021 models (GMC had only offered the Yukon in that country because GM did not want to have the Yukon XL cannibalized in terms of sales with the Suburban, which is also that country's best-selling SUV), where it is only available in the Denali trim.

== Signature Editions ==
Beginning with the 2018 model year, Chevrolet offered a "Signature Edition" package/trims of the Suburban. Each of the specialty versions were available at the LT and Premier level trims. Both the Z71 and RST became the fourth and fifth level trims starting with the twelfth generation Suburban for the 2021 model year, while the remaining continues as package features.

=== Z71 and Texas Edition ===
On September 26, 2014, Chevrolet debuted the updated Z71 Suburban at the State Fair of Texas, along with the debut of the Texas Edition Suburban, the latter due to Texas having the most units of Suburbans sold in the United States (As of August 2014, sales of the Chevrolet SUVs in Texas were up 37 percent) and to celebrate the 60th anniversary of GM's Arlington Assembly plant; production of the Z71 Suburban began in October 2014.

As with the previous Z71 Suburbans, this version continued to be offered in a 4WD LT trim only, featuring a front skid plate, off-road tires mounted on 18-inch wheels, a unique grille, running boards, and "Z71" identification inside and out. Fog lamps, front tow hooks, and front parking assist are also included. The 2016 Z71 package was modified again, as portions of the Z71 items added on the Texas Edition package as an optional feature by request from customers was discontinued, making it a stand-alone package. The Z71 package was upgraded to a level trim starting with the twelfth generation models.

The Texas Edition Suburban, which became part of the Texas Edition lineup along with the Tahoe and Silverado, was available in both LT and LTZ trims for the 2015 model year, featuring a maximum trailering package, twenty-inch polished aluminum wheels (on LT models), twenty-two-inch premium painted aluminum wheels (on LTZ models), and an exclusive "Texas Edition" badge. For the 2016 model year, Chevrolet discontinued the LTZ package but modified for the LT package without the requested Z71 features. The twelfth-generation Suburban continues to offer the Texas Edition for the LT and Premier trims only when combined with the Luxury, LT Signature, and Premium packages.

=== LT Signature Edition ===
The Suburban LT Signature Edition, introduced in the 2018 model year, was an optional package trim, similar to the luxury package but with less expensive features, available in the LT level trim only. This option was discontinued after the 2019 model year but will be offered for the 2021 model year.

=== Midnight Edition ===
A Midnight Edition Suburban, an all-black optional package available in 4WD LT and Z71 versions, was introduced for the 2017 model year. This version became part of the Signature Edition Suburban feature for the 2018 model year up until the 2020 model year.

=== Premier Plus ===
On August 13, 2018, Chevrolet introduced a more upgraded version of the top-of-the-line Premier level trim of the Suburban, packaged as the Premier Plus, featuring a 6.2-liter engine, the classic gold bowtie emblems, chrome nameplate badging, and new polished 22-inch wheels. The interior is unique to these models, boasting with heated/ventilated Black-and-Mahogany leather front seats, Jet Black trim surround, a head-up display, and an eight-inch cluster. The exterior features standard cross rails, chrome power steps, and chrome exhaust tips. This feature was discontinued in the 2020 model year.

=== RST Edition ===
Chevrolet added a new package to the 2018 model year Suburban with the introduction of the street-themed RST (Rally Sport Truck) Special Edition Suburban. Originally at the time of the announcement, it was supposed to be available as an option for the LT and Premier trims as a Performance Package that included a 420-horsepower (313 kW; 426 PS), 6.2-liter V-8 engine, a Magnetic Ride Control with performance calibration, and an all-new Hydra-Matic 10L80 10-speed automatic transmission. The press release also detailed additional features; The chrome elements are absent as body-color grilles surround the door and handles, along with an added gloss-black grille and mirror caps, black roof rails, window trim, badging and Chevy bowties, an exclusive 22-inch wheels wrapped in Bridgestone P285/45R 22 tires, a Borla performance exhaust system, massive front red Brembo six-piston, fixed aluminum calipers with brake pads clamping on larger-than-stock 410 mm × 32 mm (16.1 in × 1.3 in) Duralife rotors, coupled with an 84 percent increase in brake pad area and a 42 percent increase in rotor area to increase system thermal capacity.

However, after the press release, Chevrolet confirmed that the RST Suburban would only be available as an appearance package, as the 6.2-liter engine would not be used for the 2018 model year. But on May 4, 2018, Chevrolet expanded the RST package to the Suburban as an option for the 2019 model year that will now include the 10-speed automatic transmission and 6.2L engine, reversing a decision made by GM that it would be exclusive to GMC and Cadillac's Suburban siblings Yukon XL and Escalade ESV. The packaged trim went on sale in July 2018. The RST package option became a level trim with the twelfth-generation Suburban for the 2021 model year.

== Additional changes ==
=== Upgrades ===
GM offered another off-road variant or trim for the Suburban and Yukon XL starting with the eleventh generation. With the relaunch of the Z71 package in the Suburban for the 2015–2020 models, GM filed papers to trademark the Trail Boss name for use on future Chevrolet truck and SUV models, although they were never used for the Suburban trims.

=== Concept versions ===
On November 4, 2013, Chevrolet unveiled a concept design for the Suburban called the Half-Pipe, whose features include roof racks and crossbars to mount skis, at the SEMA Show. Afterwards, Chevrolet made its parts available for order at Chevrolet Accessories.

At the 2017 SEMA Show, a 4×4 off-road Suburban concept inspired by Country singer (and Chevrolet spokesman) Luke Bryan based around his 2016 song "Huntin', Fishin' and Lovin' Every Day" was introduced, decked out in custom Hunter Bronze exterior color with Dark Carbon accents and camo graphics, a roof-mounted light rack and a custom lower fascia, a liftgate re-engineered to swing outward rather than upward and incorporates a custom spare tire mount, 22-inch wheels with 35-inch-tall tires, roof-mounted equipment carrier with a fishing rod holder, an interior design consisting of Black and Two-Tone Olive with Argon Orange, unique seating featuring Argon piping and Platinum camo-pattern perforated designs, and the "Huntin', Fishin' and Lovin' Every Day" badges (designated by symbols in lieu of the words) displayed on both the exterior and interior. The rear windows are removed. The concept was inspired by Bryan himself and collaborated with Chevrolet on this project as he is an owner of a Suburban: "Chevy has been part of our family and a part of our work life on the farm for as long as I can remember," says Bryan. "If you were a Bryan, you drove a Chevy — and I'm a longtime Suburban owner. This partnership is a natural fit for me and this unique Suburban represents everything I and my family want for our outdoor adventures."

=== Aftermarket options ===
In 2011, Callaway Cars offered an upgraded Eaton supercharger package to the Suburban for an additional $15,995 (~$22,552 in 2025).

In 2014, Callaway once again offered a supercharged version of the new 2015 K2XX Suburban.

In 2015, Corsa Performance added a cat-back exhaust system package for customers looking to upgrade their K2XX Suburban or Yukon XL, which would give the 5.3-liter versions a 669% flow increase and the 6.2-liter versions a 342% flow increase.

In 2018, Freedom Mobility partnered with GM to have their trucks and SUVs equipped with features that will make it accessible to disabled and visible/hearing impaired drivers or passengers. The Suburban is among the selected vehicles that will be available with this option.

== Military applications ==
LSSV
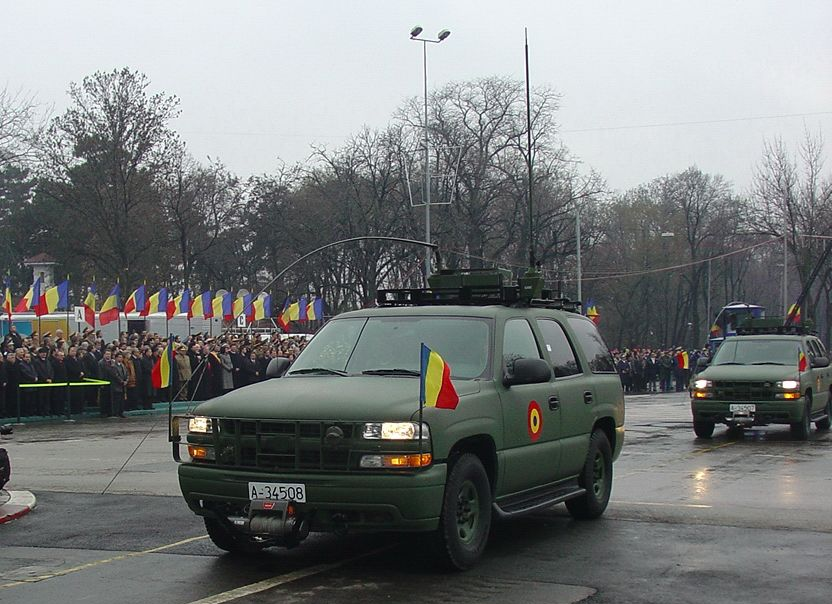

Overview
- Manufacturer: General Motors, AM General
- Model years: 2001–present

Body and chassis
- Body style: 2-door SUV; 4-door SUV; 2-door pickup; 4-door pickup
- Platform: GM GMT880 platform

Powertrain
- Engine: 6.6 L Duramax V8
- Transmission: 4-speed 4L80-E automatic; 5-speed Allison 1000 automatic

When production of the CUCV II ended in 2000, GM redesigned it to coincide with civilian truck offerings. The CUCV nomenclature was changed to Light Service Support Vehicle in 2001. In 2005, LSSV production switched to AM General, a unit of MacAndrews and Forbes Holdings. The LSSV is a GM-built Chevrolet Silverado 2500 HD, Chevrolet Tahoe, or Chevrolet Suburban that is powered by a Duramax 6.6-liter turbo diesel engine. As GM has periodically redesigned its civilian trucks and SUVs from 2001 to the present, LSSVs have also been updated cosmetically.

The militarization of the standard GM trucks/SUVs to become LSSVs includes exterior changes such as CARC paint (Forest Green, Desert Sand, or 3-color Camouflage), blackout lights, military bumpers, a brush guard, a NATO slave receptacle/NATO trailer receptacle, a pintle hook, tow shackles, and a 24/12-volt electrical system. The dashboard has additional controls and dataplates. The truck also can be equipped with weapon supports in the cab, cargo tie-down hooks, folding troop seats, pioneer tools, winches, and other military accessories. In the Canadian Army these vehicles are nicknamed "Milverado".

The Enhanced Mobility Package (EMP) option adds an uprated suspension, 4-wheel anti-lock brakes, a locking rear differential, beadlock tires, a tire pressure monitoring system, and other upgrades. About 2,000 LSSV units have been sold to U.S. and international military and law enforcement organizations.

=== Variants ===
- Cargo/Troop Carrier Pickup (2-door, Extended Cab, or 4-door Silverado)
- Cargo/Troop Carrier/Command Vehicle (4-door Tahoe)
- Cargo/Troop Carrier/Command Vehicle/Ambulance (4-door Suburban)

== Safety ==
=== National Highway Traffic Safety Administration (NHTSA) ===
==== 2007–14 ====
For the 2009 model year, the Suburban received the U.S. National Highway Traffic Safety Administration's (NHTSA) best rating of 5 stars in the frontal driver/passenger and side driver/passenger categories.

NHTSA Chevrolet Suburban crash test results (For 2009 models):

- Frontal Driver:
- Frontal Passenger:
- Side Driver:
- Side Rear Passenger:
- 2WD Rollover:
- 4WD Rollover:

==== 2015–present ====
For the 2015 model year, the Suburban received an NHTSA rating of 4 stars overall, with the side driver/passenger categories receiving 5 stars. (Because of more stringent tests, 2011 and newer model ratings are not comparable to 1990–2010 ratings.) The NHTSA gave the 2016 models 4 stars overall in its review, similar to its review of its 2015 models.

NHTSA Chevrolet Suburban crash test results (For 2015 models):

- Frontal Driver:
- Frontal Passenger:
- Side Driver:
- Side Rear Passenger:
- 2WD Rollover:
- 4WD Rollover:

=== Insurance Institute for Highway Safety (IIHS) ===
==== 1995–99 Suburban ====
The IIHS gave the Suburban an Acceptable rating along with the Chevrolet Tahoe, GMC Yukon, and Cadillac Escalade.

==== 2000–06 Suburban ====
The Suburban, Chevrolet Tahoe, GMC Yukon, and Cadillac Escalade got a Good rating and a Best Pick. However, all four including the Yukon XL got a Good rating for head protection in side and seats and head restraints.

==== 2007–14 Suburban ====
The Suburban, Chevrolet Tahoe, GMC Yukon and Cadillac Escalade earned a Good rating in the front offset. However, 2007–09 models without side airbags got a Poor rating. Models with them received a Marginal rating. 2010–14 models got a Top Safety Pick.

==== 2015–2020 Suburban ====
All of the GMT K2XX SUVs received a top safety pick, except for the Chevrolet/GMC 1500 series pickups, which have not been tested. The pickups have been tested against the moderate overlap test, for which they received a good rating.

== Recalls ==
On March 28, 2014, GM announced a recall on the 2015 Suburban and Yukon XL in order to fix a "transmission oil cooler line that is not securely seated in its fitting," causing the vehicle to stop and rupture the oil cooling line, resulting in the engine to malfunction and catch fire immediately. The move comes on the heels on an incident that happened on March 23, 2014, when a 2015 GMC Yukon caught fire in Anaheim, California during a test drive. Despite being an isolated incident, the 2015 Suburban and Yukon XL are not tied to GM's announced recall of its vehicles (from previous generation models and discontinued brands that were produced prior to, during, and after GM's restructuring in 2010) that was made on March 17, 2014.

On June 6, 2014, GM issued another recall on the 2015 Suburban and Yukon XL because their radio control modules may not work, and thus prevent certain audible safety warnings. This would be followed on June 27 with another recall, in which the transfer case "may electronically switch to neutral without input from the driver," adding that if this occurs while the vehicle is moving, power will not be sent to the wheels, meaning that if the vehicle is parked, it may roll away unexpectedly if the parking brake has not been set.

On December 5, 2014, GM announced that it is replacing ignition key units on the 2015 Suburban and Yukon XL after customers made complaints that the shift lever strikes the head of the key if the tilt-adjustable steering column is in the fully up position. The lever only can be moved out of "park" into a gear when the engine is running and the driver's foot is on the brake. The push-button ignition features are not affected.

On January 4, 2015, GM issued a recall on tenth-generation Suburbans and Yukon XLs from the 2011 and 2012 model years for a potential ignition lock actuator issue, citing that they are not the right size and can cause the ignition to get stuck in the "Start" position, and then either due to a jarring event or a "cool interior temperature" the ignition could switch back to the "Accessory" position, resulting in a loss of power assistance and prevent the airbags from deploying.

On December 30, 2015, the NHTSA revealed that it had received complaints from 2015 Suburban/Yukon XL owners about buffeting and vibration problems causing drivers and passengers to endure an annoying vibration inside the cabin so severe that it leads to dizziness and headaches. GM is aware of this and has moved to correct the situation and try to pinpoint the source, but assures the vehicles are safe to drive.

On May 3, 2016, GM placed a recall on both 2016 model Suburbans and Yukon XLs over inadequate welds on their upper front control arms, which could result in an accident or injury.

On February 4, 2017, GM issued a recall of 2016 and 2017 Chevrolet Suburban HD models over an improperly fixed right-hand rear-view outside mirror which GM says will be replaced for free. The recall affected 211 vehicles.

== Awards ==
- 2003 – J.D. Power Highest ranked full-size SUV in initial quality
- 2004 – J.D. Power Highest ranked full-size SUV in initial quality
- 2005 – J.D. Power Highest ranked full-size SUV in initial quality
- 2014 – J.D. Power Highest ranked large SUV in initial quality
- 2014 – J.D. Power Most dependable large SUV (2011 GMC Yukon XL)
- 2015 – U.S. News & World Report Best Large SUV for Families
- 2015 – MotorWeek Drivers' Choice Awards Best Large Utility
- 2015 – Kelley Blue Book KBB.com Best Resale Value Full-Size SUV/Crossover
- 2015 – Car and Driver Editors' Choice Awards Best SUVs

== Yearly U.S. sales ==
In 1999, GM rebranded the GMC Suburban as the Yukon XL. GM discontinued tracking sales of the Yukon XL in 2018 and now includes them with the sales of the Yukon. From 2018 onward, this chart reflects only the number of Chevrolet Suburban units sold.

Calendar Year	Chevrolet Suburban	GMC Suburban	Yukon XL	Total U.S. sales
1996	94,010	43,161	–	137,171
1997	99,068	43,137	–	142,205
1998	108,933	42,423	–	151,356
1999	138,977	44,886	1,857	185,720
2000	133,123	4,776	47,016	184,915
2001	154,782	94	70,706	225,582
2002	151,056	–	67,556	218,612
2003	135,222	–	70,887	206,109
2004	119,545	–	65,917	185,462
2005	87,011	–	53,652	140,663
2006	77,211	–	45,413	122,624
2007	83,673	–	45,303	128,976
2008	54,058	–	26,404	80,462
2009	41,055	–	16,819	57,874
2010	45,152	–	23,797	68,949
2011	49,427	–	25,223	74,650
2012	48,116	–	23,427	71,543
2013	51,260	–	31,258	82,518
2014	55,009	–	29,752	84,761
2015	50,866	–	31,334	82,200
2016	60,082	–	37,054	97,136
2017	56,516	–	35,059	91,575
2018	60,633	—N/a		
2019	51,928	—N/a		
2020	37,636	—N/a		
2021	48,214	—N/a		
2022	50,951	—N/a		
2023	52,820	—N/a		
2024	44,398	—N/a		
2025	58,683	—N/a		
