= Kirby Puckett =

American baseball player (1960–2006)

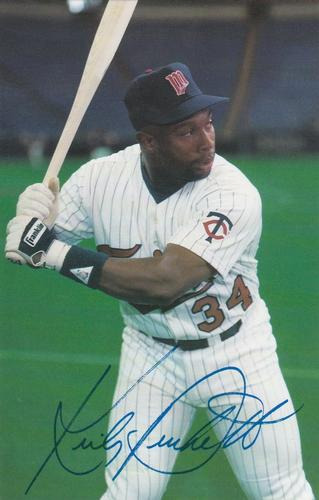
- Puckett with the Minnesota Twins in 1987
- Center fielder
- Born: March 14, 1960; Chicago, Illinois, U.S.
- Died: March 6, 2006 (aged 45); Phoenix, Arizona, U.S.
- Batted: Right Threw: Right

MLB debut
- May 8, 1984, for the Minnesota Twins

Last MLB appearance
- September 28, 1995, for the Minnesota Twins

MLB statistics
- Batting average: .318
- Hits: 2,304
- Home runs: 207
- Runs batted in: 1,085
- Stats at Baseball Reference

Teams
- Minnesota Twins (1984–1995)

Career highlights and awards
- 10× All-Star (1986–1995); 2× World Series champion (1987, 1991); ALCS MVP (1991); 6× Gold Glove Award (1986–1989, 1991, 1992); 6× Silver Slugger Award (1986–1989, 1992, 1994); Roberto Clemente Award (1996); AL batting champion (1989); AL RBI leader (1994); Minnesota Twins No. 34 retired; Minnesota Twins Hall of Fame

Member of the National

Baseball Hall of Fame
- Induction: 2001
- Vote: 82.1% (first ballot)

Kirby Puckett (March 14, 1960 – March 6, 2006) was an American professional baseball player. He played his entire 12-year Major League Baseball (MLB) career for the Minnesota Twins (1984–1995). Puckett was instrumental in helping the Twins to win World Series championships in 1987 and 1991. Puckett generally played center field, although he was shifted to right field later in his career.

Puckett was known for having hit a dramatic game-winning home run in Game Six of the 1991 World Series. Puckett led the American League in batting with a .339 average in 1989 and led the league with 112 runs batted in in 1994. Overall, he won six Silver Slugger Awards and six Gold Gloves during his playing career and was named to the AL All-Star Team 10 times. He finished his career with a .318 batting average, 207 home runs, and 1085 runs batted in.

After being forced to retire in 1996 at age 36 due to loss of vision in one eye from a central retinal vein occlusion, Puckett was elected to the Baseball Hall of Fame in 2001 in his first year of eligibility. Puckett was known "for his sunny personality and his passion for baseball" and was "perhaps the most popular athlete in Minnesota history". However, his reputation was adversely affected by various off-the-field incidents that became public following his retirement. He died of a cerebral hemorrhage in 2006 at the age of 45.

== Early life ==
Kirby Puckett was born March 14, 1960, in Chicago, Illinois. (Note: His birth year is sometimes erroneously listed as 1961.) The youngest of William and Catherine Puckett's nine children, Kirby was born 22 years after his oldest sibling, Charles. Puckett's father worked two full-time jobs at a department store and the post office, leaving Catherine to raise the children. Raised in a three-bedroom apartment in the Robert Taylor Homes Chicago housing project, Puckett taught himself to play baseball by practicing hitting and throwing against a wall.

An All-American baseball player at Calumet High School, Puckett received little attention from baseball scouts, and he took a job installing carpeting in new cars for the Ford Motor Company. After being laid off by Ford, Puckett attended an open tryout hosted by the Kansas City Royals of Major League Baseball (MLB), where he received a college baseball scholarship from Bradley University. During the 1981 season, Puckett led the Bradley Braves with eight home runs, 21 stolen bases, and a .660 slugging percentage, while his .378 batting average was second on the team. His grades suffered following the sudden death of his father, however, and he transferred to Triton College after one year. During the 1982 season at Triton, Puckett batted .472 with 16 home runs and 78 runs batted in (RBI), and he was named the National Junior College Athletic Association Player of the Year.

== Career ==
=== Draft and minor leagues ===
As teams tried to save money during the 1981 MLB strike, only one scout watched Puckett at Bradley: Jim Rantz of the Minnesota Twins, who recommended that the team take him third overall in the January 1982 MLB draft. Puckett turned down the Twins' initial $6,000 contract, signing with them for $20,000 after the JUCO World Series. After signing with Minnesota, Puckett was assigned to the Rookie-level Elizabethton Twins, where he batted .382 with three home runs and 35 RBI in 65 games, winning the Appalachian League batting title in the process.

In 1983, Puckett was promoted to the Single-A Visalia Oaks in the California League, where he hit .318 with nine home runs, 97 RBI, and 48 stolen bases over 138 games. After being promoted to the AAA Toledo Mud Hens to start the 1984 season, Puckett was brought up to the majors for good 21 games into the season.

=== Minnesota Twins ===
Puckett's major league debut came on May 8, 1984, against the California Angels, a game in which he went 4-for-5 with one run. That year, Puckett hit .296 and was fourth in the American League in singles. In 1985, Puckett hit .288 and finished fourth in the league in hits, third in triples, second in plate appearances, and first in at bats. Throughout his career, Puckett would routinely appear in the top 10 in the American League in such offensive statistical categories as games played, at bats, singles, doubles, and total bases and such defensive stats as putouts, assists, and fielding percentage for league center fielders.

In 1986, Puckett began to emerge as more than just a singles hitter. With an average of .328, Puckett was elected to his first Major League Baseball All-Star Game and he finished the season seventh in doubles, sixth in home runs, fourth in extra-base hits, third in slugging percentage, and second in runs scored, hits, total bases, and at-bats. Kirby was also recognized for his defensive skills, earning his first Gold Glove Award.

Puckett was instrumental in helping the Twins to win World Series championships in 1987 and 1991.

==== 1987–1990 (First World Series title) ====
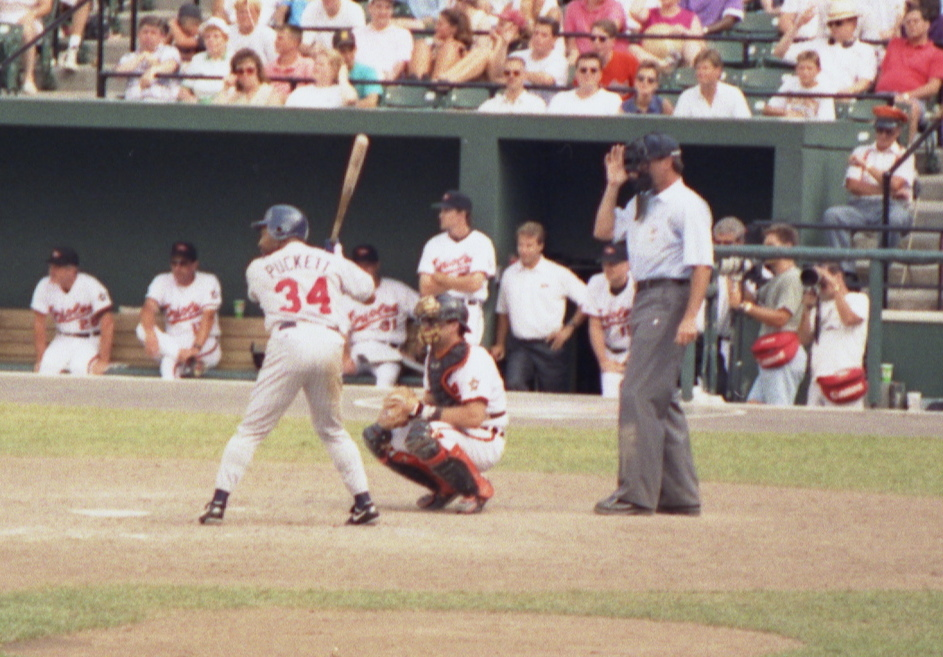
Puckett bats against the Baltimore Orioles, 1993

In 1987, the Twins reached the postseason for the first time since 1970 despite finishing with a mark of 85–77. Once there, Puckett helped lead the Twins to the 1987 World Series, the Twins' second series appearance since relocating to Minnesota and fifth in franchise history. For the season, Puckett batted .332 with 28 home runs and 99 RBIs. Although he hit only .208 in the Twins' five game AL Championship Series win over the Detroit Tigers, Puckett would produce in the seven-game World Series upset over the St. Louis Cardinals, where he batted .357.

During the year, Puckett put on his best performance on August 30 in Milwaukee against the Brewers, when he went 6-for-6 with two home runs, one off Juan Nieves in the third and the other off closer Dan Plesac in the ninth.

Statistically speaking, Puckett had his best all-around season in 1988, hitting 24 home runs with a career-high .356 average and 121 RBIs, finishing third in the AL MVP balloting for the second straight season. Although the Twins won 91 games, six more than in their championship season, the team finished a distant second in the American League West, 13 games behind the Oakland Athletics.

Puckett won the AL batting title in 1989 with a mark of .339, while also finishing fifth in at-bats, second in doubles, first in hits, and second in singles. The Twins, two years removed from the championship season, slumped, going 80–82 and finishing in fifth place, 19 games behind the Athletics. In April 1989, he recorded his 1,000th hit, becoming the fourth player in Major League Baseball history to do so in his first five seasons. After the 1989 season, Puckett signed a 3-year, $9 million contract with the Twins, making him the first baseball player to earn at least $3 million per year of salary. He continued to play well in 1990, but had a down season, finishing with a .298 batting average, and the Twins mirrored his performance as the team slipped all the way to last place in the AL West with a record of 74–88.

==== 1991–1995 (Second World Series title) ====
In 1991, the Twins got back on the winning track and Puckett led the way by batting .319, eighth in the league and Minnesota surged past Oakland midseason to capture the division title. The Twins then beat the Toronto Blue Jays in five games in the American League Championship Series as Puckett batted .429 with two home runs and five RBI to win the ALCS MVP.

The subsequent 1991 World Series was ranked by ESPN to be the best ever played, with four games decided on the final pitch and three games going into extra innings. The Twins and their opponent, the Atlanta Braves, had each finished last in their respective divisions in the year before winning their league pennant, something that had never happened before.

Going into Game 6, the Twins trailed three games to two with each team winning their respective home games. Puckett gave the Twins an early lead by driving in Chuck Knoblauch with a triple in the first inning. Puckett then made a leaping catch in front of the Plexiglass wall in left field to rob Ron Gant of an extra-base hit in the third. The game went into extra innings, and in the first at-bat of the bottom of the 11th, Puckett hit a dramatic game-winning home run on a 2–1 count off of Charlie Leibrandt to send the Series to Game 7. This dramatic game has been widely remembered as the high point in Puckett's career. The images of Puckett rounding the bases, arms raised in triumph (often punctuated by CBS television broadcaster Jack Buck saying "And we'll see you tomorrow night!") are frequently included in video highlights of his career. The Twins then went on to win Game 7 1–0, with Jack Morris throwing a 10-inning complete game, and claimed their second World Series crown in five years.

Though the Twins didn't make it to the postseason for the rest of Puckett's career, he remained an elite player. In 1994, Puckett was switched to right field and won his first league RBI title by driving in 112 runs in only 108 games, a pace that projects to 168 RBIs over a full season. He also broke the record for Twins career hits on June 26 with three hits in the game against the Kansas City Royals that the Twins won 11–4, giving him 2,088 hits. Previously Rod Carew held that record with 2,085 hits. But the 1994 season was cut short by a players' strike, ending his chances for two consecutive RBI titles.

Puckett was still performing well in the 1995 season before having his jaw broken in his final career plate appearance by a Dennis Martínez fastball on September 28.

=== Retirement ===
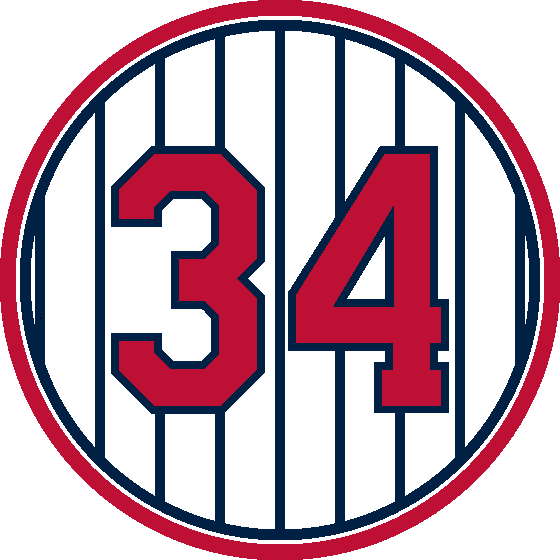
Kirby Puckett's number 34 was retired by the Minnesota Twins in 1997.

After spending the spring of 1996 continuing to blister Grapefruit League batting with a .344 average, Puckett woke up on March 28 without vision in his right eye. He was diagnosed with glaucoma, and was placed on the disabled list for the first time in his professional career. Three surgeries over the next few months could not restore vision in the eye. Puckett was diagnosed with a central retinal vein occlusion. When it was apparent that he would never be able to play again, Puckett announced his retirement on July 12, 1996, at the age of 36. He had played his entire 12-year career with the Twins. Following his retirement, the Twins made him an executive vice president of the team.

Puckett received the 1996 Roberto Clemente Award for community service.

=== Legacy ===
Puckett won the 1989 American League batting title with a .339 batting average. He also led the league in runs batted in with 112 in 1994. Puckett won six Silver Slugger Awards and six Gold Gloves during his playing career. He was named to the AL All-Star Team 10 times. He finished his career with a .318 batting average, 207 home runs, and 1085 runs batted in. At the time of Puckett's retirement, his .318 career batting average was the highest of any right-handed batter since Joe DiMaggio. Also, he amassed 2,040 hits in the first 10 seasons of his career; this total exceeded that of any other 20th-century player.

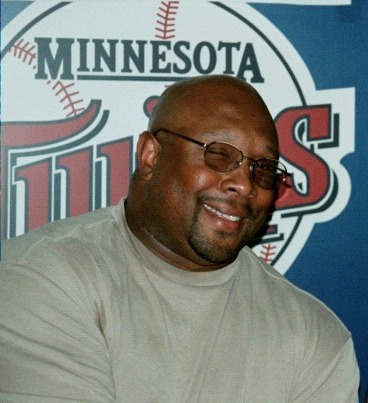
Puckett in 1997

The Twins retired Puckett's number 34 in 1997. In 2001 balloting, he was elected to the Baseball Hall of Fame in his first year of eligibility. In 1999, he ranked Number 86 on The Sporting News list of the 100 Greatest Baseball Players.

In 1993, Puckett received the Branch Rickey Award for his lifetime of community service work.

On April 12, 2010, a statue of Puckett was unveiled at the plaza of Target Field in Minneapolis. The plaza runs up against the stadium's largest gate, Gate 34, numbered in honor of Puckett. The statue, by sculptor Bill Mack, represents Puckett pumping his fist while running the bases after his winning home run in Game 6 of the 1991 World Series.

At the time of his own retirement in 2016, longtime Boston Red Sox first baseman/designated hitter David Ortiz stated that he had used uniform number 34 with the Red Sox to honor Puckett's friendship with him. Ortiz had begun his MLB career with the Twins.

In 1997, Jim Souhan of the Star Tribune wrote: "What Puckett meant to the Twins transcended statistics, just as his fire-hydrant-shaped body often crested the Metrodome's centerfield fence. He overcame the limits of his short, squat body, and of his upbringing in the projects on Chicago's South Side, to demonstrate the joys that baseball can bring a player and a community".

According to The New York Times, Puckett was known "for his sunny personality and his passion for baseball". The Star Tribune has stated that Puckett possessed a "blend of Hall of Fame skill and persistent joyfulness" that made him "perhaps the most popular athlete in Minnesota history". However, Puckett's reputation was adversely affected by various off-the-field incidents that became public following his retirement.

== Personal life ==
Puckett married his wife, Tonya, in 1986. The Pucketts had two children and divorced in 2002.

Following his retirement, Puckett's weight increased to nearly 300 lbs. In March 2002, a woman filed for an order of protection against Puckett's wife, Tonya Puckett, claiming that Tonya had threatened to kill her over an alleged affair with Puckett. Later that same month, another woman asked for protection from Puckett himself, claiming in court documents that he had shoved her in his Bloomington condominium during the course of an 18-year relationship.

In September 2002, Puckett was accused of groping a woman in a restaurant bathroom and was charged with false imprisonment, fifth-degree criminal sexual conduct, and fifth-degree assault. He was found not guilty on all counts.

The March 17, 2003, issue of Sports Illustrated included an article by columnist Frank Deford entitled "The Rise and Fall of Kirby Puckett". The article contrasted Puckett's private life with his public image. Deford reported that Tonya Puckett alleged that Puckett had physically abused her and threatened to kill her on multiple occasions. He also reported that Puckett had engaged in multiple adulterous relationships.

== Death ==
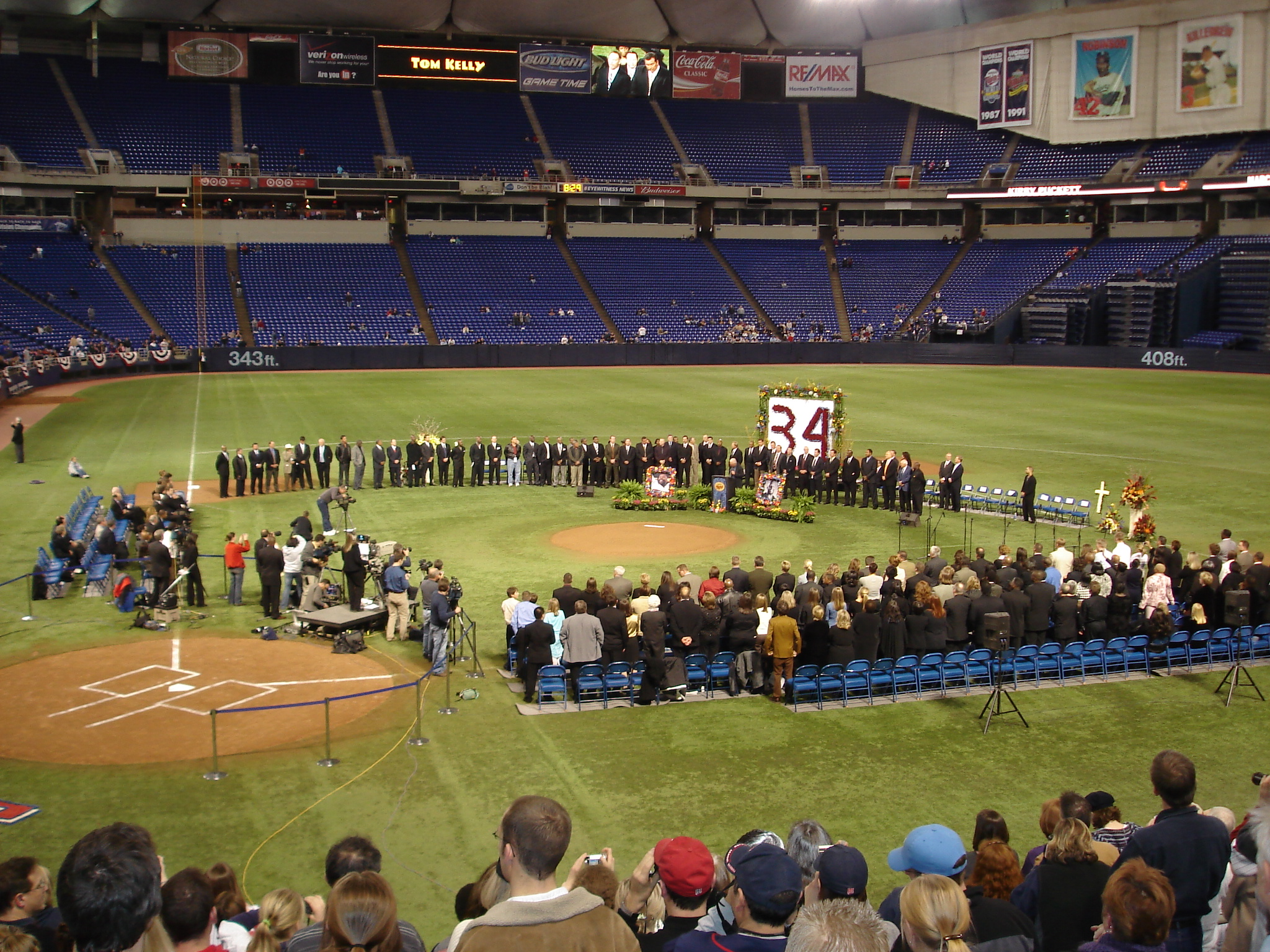
Former manager Tom Kelly surrounded by former teammates Dan Gladden, Jim "Mudcat" Grant, and Kent Hrbek, Hall of Famer Harmon Killebrew, and friends at the Memorial at the Metrodome on March 12, 2006

On the morning of March 5, 2006, Puckett suffered a massive hemorrhagic stroke at the home he shared with his fiancée, Jodi Olson. He underwent emergency surgery that day to relieve pressure on his brain; however, the surgery failed, and his former teammates and coaches were notified the following morning that his death was near. Many, including 1991 Twins teammates Shane Mack and Kent Hrbek, flew to Phoenix to be at his bedside during his final hours along with Puckett's two children. Puckett died at the age of 45 on March 6 shortly after being disconnected from life support.

In the subsequent autopsy, the official cause of death was recorded as "cerebral hemorrhage due to hypertension". Puckett died at the second-youngest age (behind Lou Gehrig) of any Hall of Famer inducted while living, and the youngest to die after being inducted in the modern era of the five-season waiting period. Puckett was survived by his son Kirby Jr. and daughter Catherine.

== Career statistics ==
| Years | G | AB | R | H | 2B | 3B | HR | RBI | SB | BB | AVG | OBP | SLG | OPS | FLD% |
|---|---|---|---|---|---|---|---|---|---|---|---|---|---|---|---|
| 12 | 1783 | 7244 | 1071 | 2304 | 414 | 57 | 207 | 1085 | 134 | 450 | .318 | .360 | .477 | .837 | .989 |

In 24 postseason games, Puckett batted .309 (30-for-97) with 16 runs, three doubles, two triples, five home runs, 16 RBI, three stolen bases and eight walks.

== See also ==
- DHL Hometown Heroes
- List of Major League Baseball annual runs batted in leaders
- List of Major League Baseball batting champions
- List of Major League Baseball career doubles leaders
- List of Major League Baseball career hits leaders
- List of Major League Baseball career runs batted in leaders
- List of Major League Baseball career runs scored leaders
- List of Major League Baseball hit records
- List of Major League Baseball players to hit for the cycle
- List of Major League Baseball players who spent their entire career with one franchise
- List of Major League Baseball single-game hits leaders
- Major League Baseball titles leaders

== Notes ==
Awards and achievements
| Preceded by Don Mattingly; Roberto Alomar | American League Player of the Month; April 1986; May & June 1992 | Succeeded by Wade Boggs; Edgar Martínez |
| Preceded by Tony Phillips | Hitting for the cycle August 1, 1986 | Succeeded by Andre Dawson |
