= Mount Trashmore (Florida) =

Landfill in Broward County, Florida

Coordinates: 26.28349°N 80.16166°W

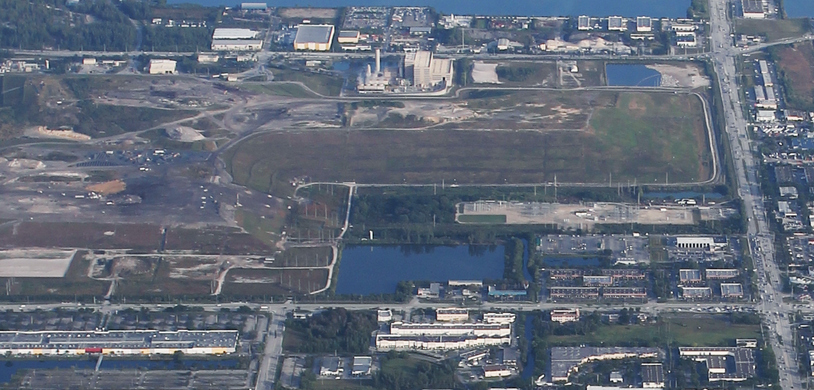
- Aerial photo of the landfill

Highest point
- Elevation: 225 ft (69 m)

Naming
- Language of name: English

Geography
- Location: Broward County, Florida
- Country: United States
- State: Florida
- Region: South Florida

Geology
- Formed by: Waste Management, Inc.

Monarch Hill Renewable Energy Park, colloquially known as Mount Trashmore, is a 225-foot high (69 m) landfill site located in an unincorporated area of northern Broward County, Florida, bordered by the cities of Pompano Beach, Coconut Creek, and Deerfield Beach, alongside the east side of Florida's Turnpike between mile markers 69 and 70. It is owned by Waste Management, Inc. It currently takes in an average of 3,500 tons of trash daily and has the capacity to accept 10,000 tons of trash daily. The site has long emitted foul odors into the air of neighboring Coconut Creek.

== History ==
The landfill dates to 1965, when it started as the North Broward County Resource Recovery and Central Disposal Sanitary Landfill, a ten-foot high pile of debris in what was then a remote section of the county. Complaints from the city in the 1990s resulted in Waste Management being fined for violating air standards. The company attempted to alleviate the problem by covering the garbage with extra dirt and spraying deodorizer from 55-gallon drums.

In 2008, Waste Management withdrew its application to increase the height of the landfill from 225 to 280 feet (69 to 85 m). In 2011, Waste Management renamed the site the "Monarch Hill Renewable Energy Park." In 2010, after Coconut Creek threatened a lawsuit, Waste Management agreed that particularly odorous trash, such as food and other materials that decay, would no longer go into the landfill after three years. After Waste Management received a series of warnings from Broward County in 2012, it also agreed to place a cap over 10 acres (4.0 ha) of the landfill, spread 18 inches (460 mm) of soil over trash instead of the required 6 inches (150 mm), employ greater use of odor-neutralizing chemicals, and pay over $100,000 in fines and costs. Nevertheless, by 2013, Waste Management had accumulated $1.6 million in fines, and Coconut Creek was still plagued by foul odors from Monarch Hill.

In 2011, Monarch Hill was used as filming location for the film Rock of Ages (2012). Doubling for Mount Lee in Los Angeles, a 20-foot tall replica of the Hollywood Sign was built on the southwest area of the hill for the filming of a scene from the film. The set was taken down after filming concluded.

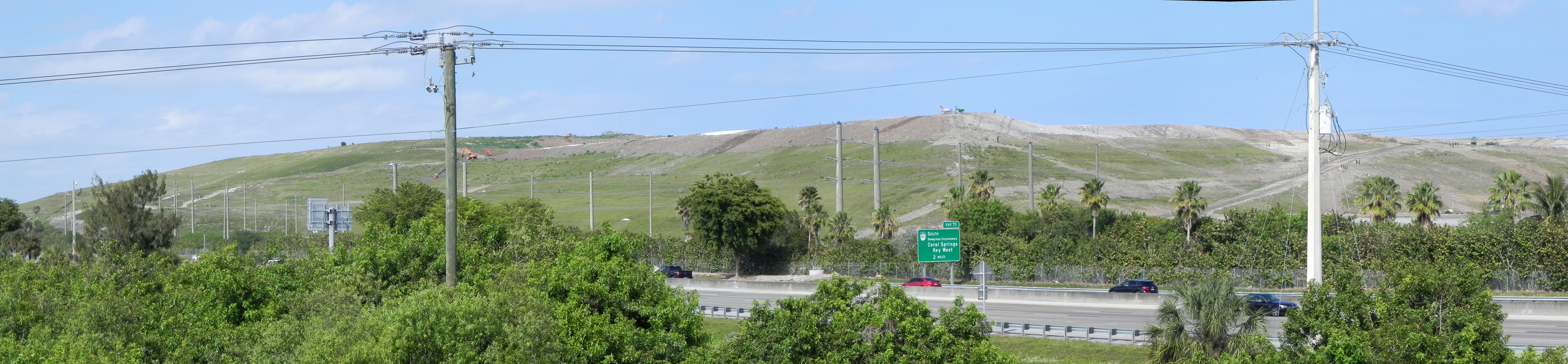
Mt. Trashmore from Sample Rd.

In 2025, Waste Management agreed to close the landfill around 2050 under an agreement reached with Broward County.
