= Syrn =

American lingerie brand

- Type: Private
- Industry: Fashion
- Founded: January 28, 2026
- Founder: Sydney Sweeney
- Headquarters: Los Angeles, California, United States
- Key people: Sydney Sweeney
- Products: Lingerie
- Owner: Sydney Sweeney
- Website: syrn.com

Syrn (stylized as SYRN) is an American lingerie brand founded by actress Sydney Sweeney. The company launched in January 2026 and is backed by venture capital funding from Coatue Management.

== History and corporate affairs ==
Development for Syrn began in mid-2024. The brand was publicly announced in January 2026.

The company is financially backed by the technology fund of the investment firm Coatue Management. According to The Business of Fashion, this fund received capital injections from Jeff Bezos and Michael Dell. Sweeney serves as the brand's creative lead.

== Hollywood Sign incident ==
During the brand's launch in January 2026, promotional footage was released showing a production crew draping lingerie over the letters of the Hollywood Sign in Los Angeles. The video depicted the crew scaling the sign and using duffel bags to transport the items.

The Hollywood Chamber of Commerce, which owns the licensing rights to the landmark, stated that the stunt was unauthorized. While the production team had secured a filming permit from FilmLA, the Chamber noted that no permission was granted for commercial use or physical access to the sign.
