= Don Lee (broadcaster) =

American automobile dealer and radio broadcaster (1880–1934)

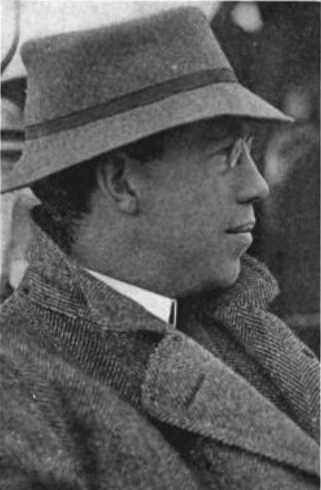
- Born: Donald Musgrave Lee; August 12, 1880; Lansing, Michigan
- Died: August 30, 1934 (aged 54); Los Angeles, California
- Occupation: Businessman

Donald Musgrave Lee (August 12, 1880 – August 30, 1934) was the exclusive West Coast distributor of Cadillac automobiles in the early 20th century.

== Biography ==
Lee was born in Lansing, Michigan. In 1919, he purchased the Earl Automobile Works of Hollywood, California. Harley Earl, the son of the company's owner, was kept on as manager. Renamed Don Lee Coach and Body Works, the company produced many custom designed Cadillacs for the rich and famous. Earl left the company to become the head of General Motors' styling department in 1927.

Lee died in Los Angeles in 1934 of a sudden heart attack, leaving control of his auto and broadcasting empire to his son, Thomas S. "Tommy" Lee (1906–1950).

== Broadcasting ==
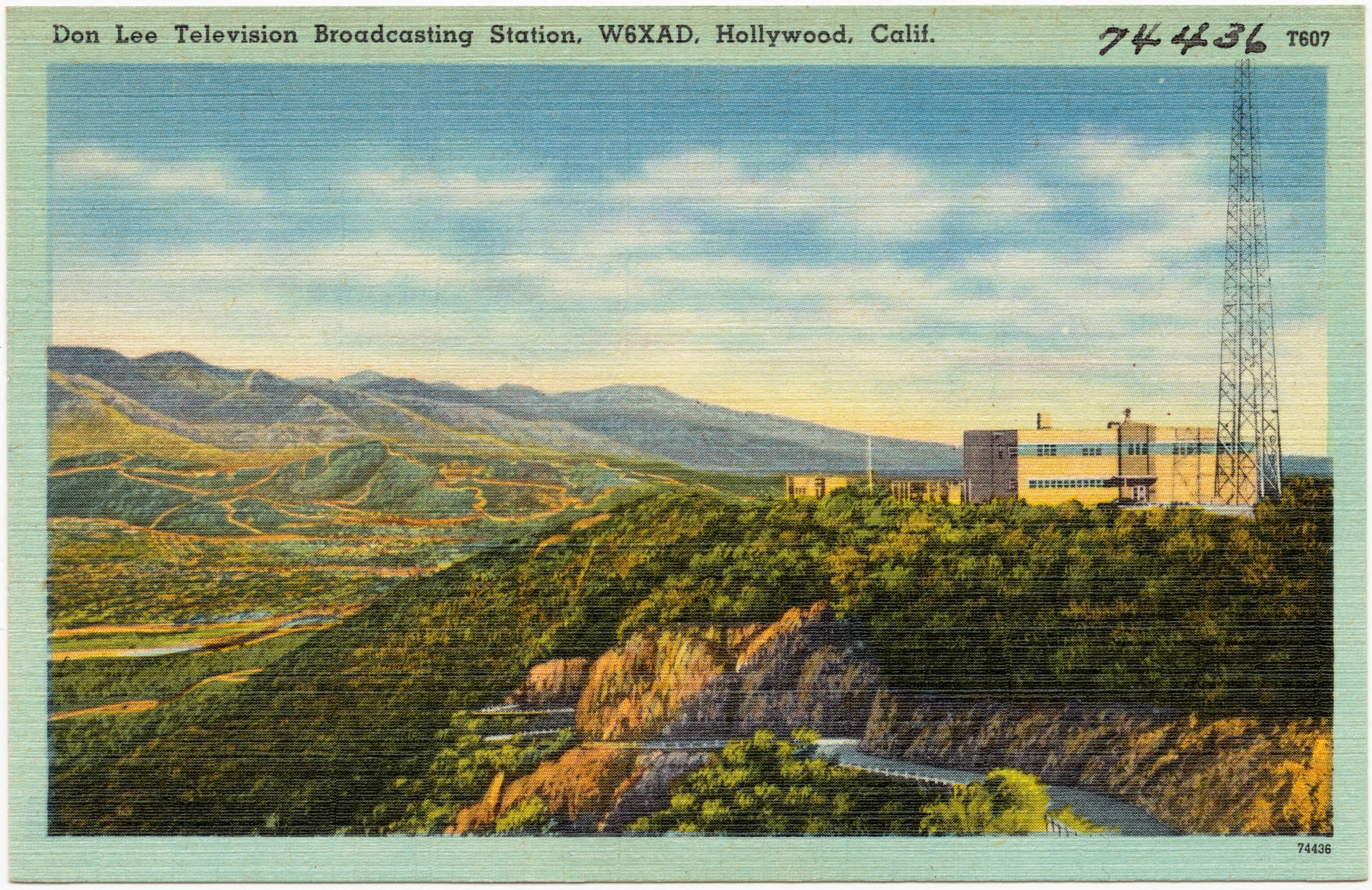
Postcard image of T.V. station W6XAO atop Mount Lee circa 1940. The station would eventually become KCBS-TV.

Having amassed a fortune selling automobiles, Lee branched out in broadcasting in 1926 when he purchased KFRC in San Francisco and relocated the station to the top floor of his Cadillac dealership at 1000 Van Ness Ave. In 1927 he purchased KHJ in Los Angeles. By mid-September 1932, Lee also had full control of KDB, Santa Barbara, and KGB, San Diego.

From 1929 to 1936, the 12-station Don Lee Network was affiliated with Columbia Broadcasting System. This venture was known as the Don Lee-Columbia Network. However, in 1936, CBS purchased KNX, along with some other West Coast stations. It also forged some new West Coast network alliances. This led to the Don Lee Network, now run by son Tommy Lee, to end its affiliation with CBS. Instead, on December 30, 1936, it became an affiliate of the Mutual Network. The two networks were known in newspaper ads as Don Lee-Mutual. Don Lee programs were offered to affiliates when Mutual had vacant time slots. The Don Lee Network was sold to ABC Radio on April 26, 1959. Programs became part of ABC.

In 1931 Lee was granted a license to begin experimental television broadcasts with station W6XAO in Los Angeles. The station later became KTSL, KNXT and is currently KCBS-TV, the flagship West Coast station for the CBS television network. The ridge above the Hollywood sign, where Lee established his transmitter, is still known as "Mount Lee".

One of the former call letters of the Don Lee affiliated outlets, KDON at Salinas-Monterey, California, is now used by its FM sister station, which is owned by iHeartMedia.

Lee died in Los Angeles, California, aged 54.
