= Hollywood Sign =

Landmark in Los Angeles, California

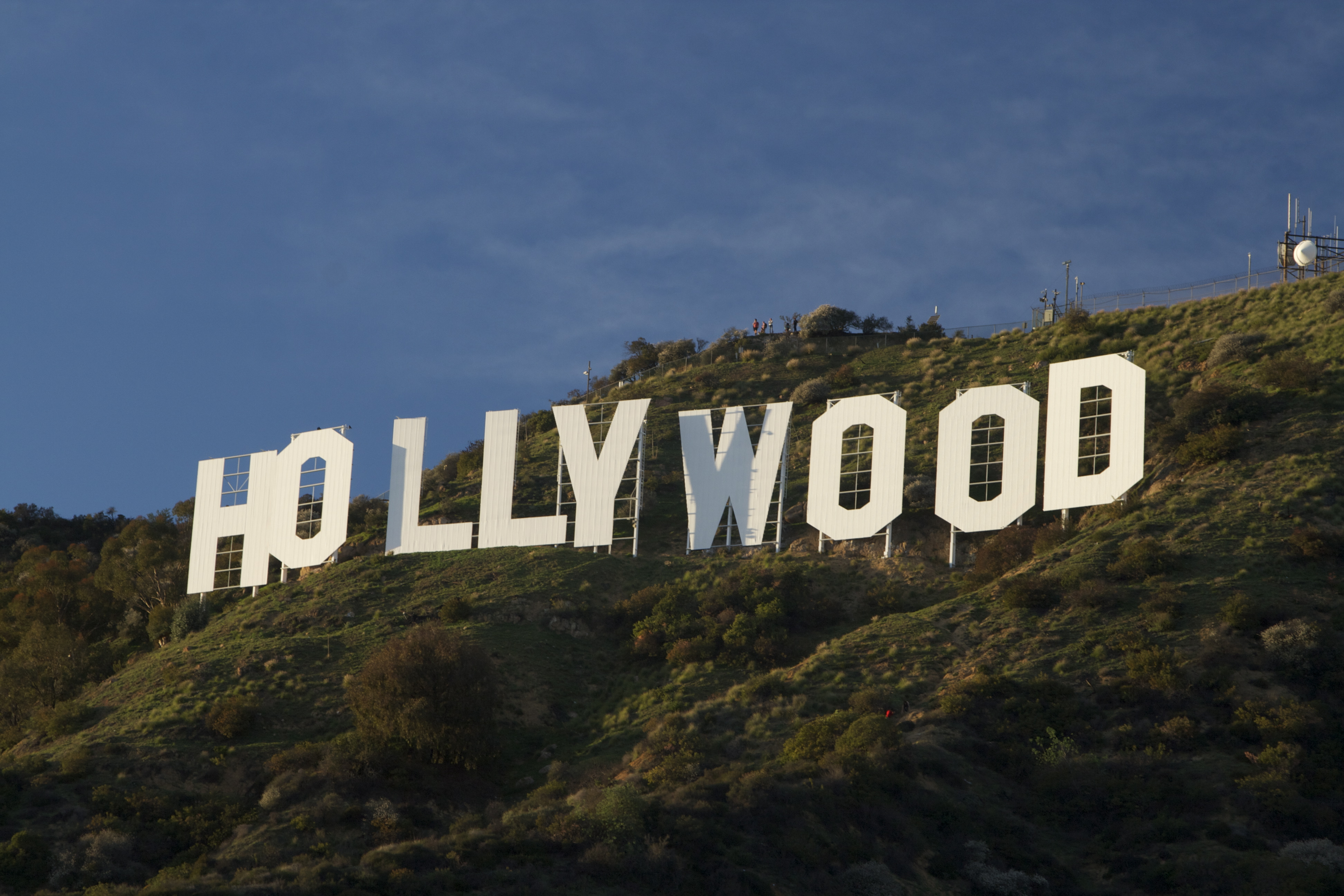
- The Hollywood Sign in 2015

- Location within the Los Angeles metropolitan area
- Former names: Hollywoodland Sign (1923–1949)

General information
- Location: Griffith Park, Mount Lee, Hollywood Hills, Los Angeles, California, United States
- Coordinates: 34°8′2.62″N 118°19′17.73″W
- Completed: 1923; 103 years ago
- Renovated: Repaired in 1949; Rebuilt in 1978; Repainted in 2005; Repainted in 2023
- Cost: $21,000
- Client: Woodruff and Shoults (Hollywoodland)

Technical details
- Structural system: Wood and sheet metal (1923–1978); Steel (1978–present)
- Size: 45 ft (13.7 m) tall, 450 ft (137.2 m) long

Design and construction
- Architect: Thomas Fisk Goff
- Engineer: Cornelius A. Van Dam

Website
- hollywoodsign.org

Los Angeles Historic-Cultural Monument
- Designated: February 7, 1973
- Reference no.: 111

The Hollywood Sign is an American landmark and cultural icon overlooking Hollywood, Los Angeles. Originally the Hollywoodland Sign, it is on Mount Lee, above Beachwood Canyon in the Santa Monica Mountains. It was originally erected in 1923 as a temporary advertisement for a local real estate development, and spelled out "HOLLYWOODLAND" in 50-foot-tall (15.2 m) white uppercase letters in a word 450 feet (137.2 m) long. Due to increasing recognition, the sign was left up; the last four letters "LAND" were removed in 1949. The sign was entirely replaced in 1978, using 45-foot-tall (13.7 m) letters in a more durable all-steel structure with concrete footings.

Among the best-known landmarks in California (and in the United States as a whole), the sign makes frequent appearances in popular culture, particularly in establishing shots for films and television programs set in Los Angeles. Signs of similar style, but spelling different words, are frequently seen as parodies. The Hollywood Chamber of Commerce holds federally registered trademark rights for a stylized "HOLLYWOOD" wordmark used on specific classes of merchandise (e.g., apparel, souvenirs). These registrations do not confer rights over the physical landmark itself, which is owned by the City of Los Angeles. A point of legal and public confusion arises because the trademark spells the same word as the landmark, the trademark's lettering style resembles the landmark's, yet the landmark and the trademark are under separate ownership.

The Hollywood Sign is promoted, protected and preserved by the Hollywood Sign Trust, a 501(c)(3) nonprofit that was originally formed by the Hollywood Chamber of Commerce in 1978; the trust was modified in 1992 to add two members appointed by the city of Los Angeles. The Hollywood Sign Trust operates closely with the Hollywood Chamber of Commerce, as they have similar missions to promote and protect historic Hollywood. The trust is made up of nine volunteers, appointed by three organizations: the Hollywood Chamber of Commerce, the office of Los Angeles's 4th City Council district, and the City of Los Angeles. The trust has been responsible for installing a surveillance system on the sign, painting and maintaining it, and celebrating its landmark anniversaries.

== History ==
=== Origin ===
The original sign was erected in 1923 and originally read "HOLLYWOODLAND" to promote the name of a new housing development in the hills above the Hollywood district of Los Angeles.

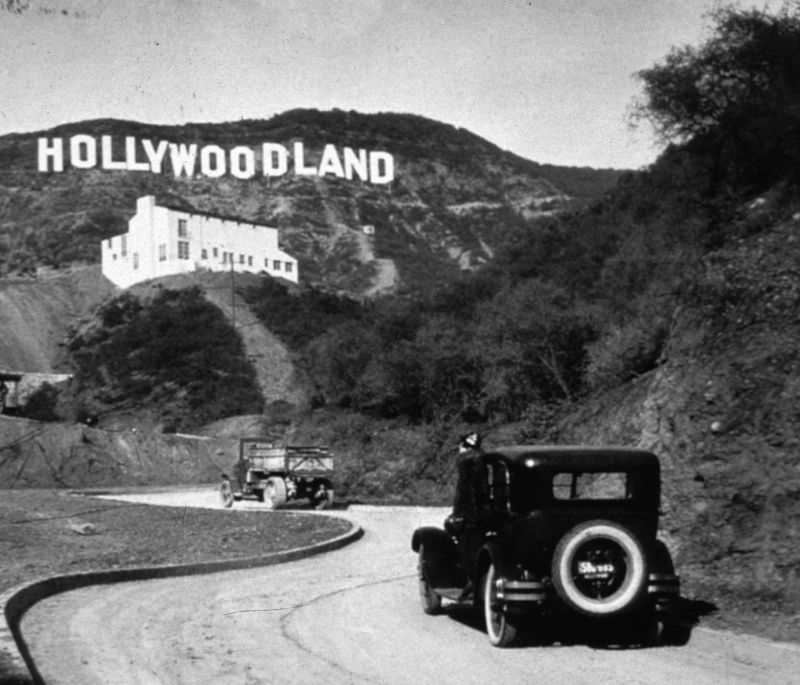
The original sign, reading "Hollywoodland"

Real estate developers Woodruff and Shoults called their development "Hollywoodland" and advertised it as a "superb environment without excessive cost on the Hollywood side of the hills."

They contracted the Crescent Sign Company to erect thirteen south-facing letters on the hillside. Crescent owner Thomas Fisk Goff (1890–1984) designed the wooden sign in 30-foot-wide (9.1 m) and 50-foot-high (15.2 m) white block letters. Studded with around 4,000 light bulbs, the completed sign alternated between flashing in successive segments "HOLLY", "WOOD", and "LAND" and as a whole. Below the sign was a searchlight to attract more attention. The poles that supported the sign were hauled to the site by mules. The project cost $21,000, equivalent to $400,000 in 2025. To place each of the letters in its correct position – on a rather steep slope with a lot of vegetation – numerous workers were recruited to transport, clear a path through the earth, and erect the sign, which currently weighs over 200 tons. First, they had to clear the vegetation and open a dirt path so a tractor could transport the material, including the 18-meter telephone poles that would serve as support. Since the last section, about 70 meters long, was very steep, the transport had to be done with pack animals.

The sign was officially dedicated on 13 July 1923, intended to last only a year and a half. The rise of American cinema in Los Angeles during the Golden Age of Hollywood gave it widespread visibility, causing it to be left beyond that, for over a quarter of a century still spelling "Hollywoodland". In September 1932, 24-year-old actress Peg Entwistle died by suicide by climbing a workman's ladder up to the top of the 'H' and jumping to her death.

The sign’s illumination was switched off in about 1933, as the new owners decided it was too expensive.

=== Deterioration and restoration ===
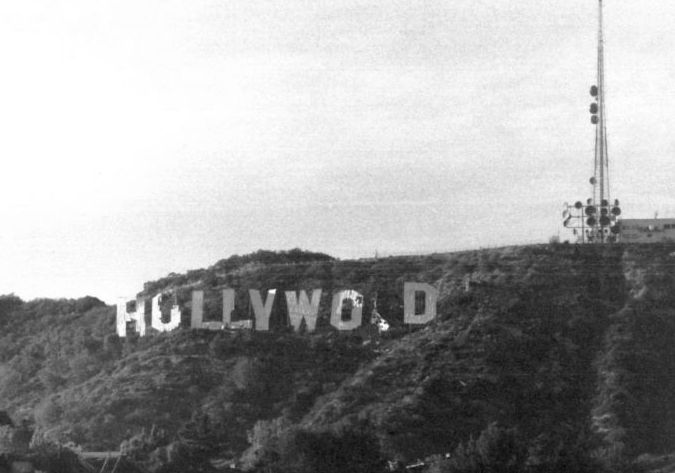
In the 1970s, the sign reached its most dilapidated state. This image was taken shortly before the sign's 1978 restoration.

==== 1940s ====
In time, the sign deteriorated. The letter H was destroyed in early 1944. A United Press report in 1949 indicated that winds were to blame, while the Los Angeles Times said that the H was destroyed by "vandals or windstorms."

In 1949, the sign drew complaints from local residents, who called it an "eyesore and detriment to the community" and advocated its demolition. The Hollywood Chamber of Commerce protested against the sign's removal and offered to repair it. The Chamber entered into a contract with the City of Los Angeles Parks Department to repair and rebuild the sign. The contract stipulated that "LAND" be removed to spell "Hollywood" and reflect the district, not the "Hollywoodland" housing development. The restoration and removal of the "land" portion of the sign was conducted in September 1949.

==== 1970s ====
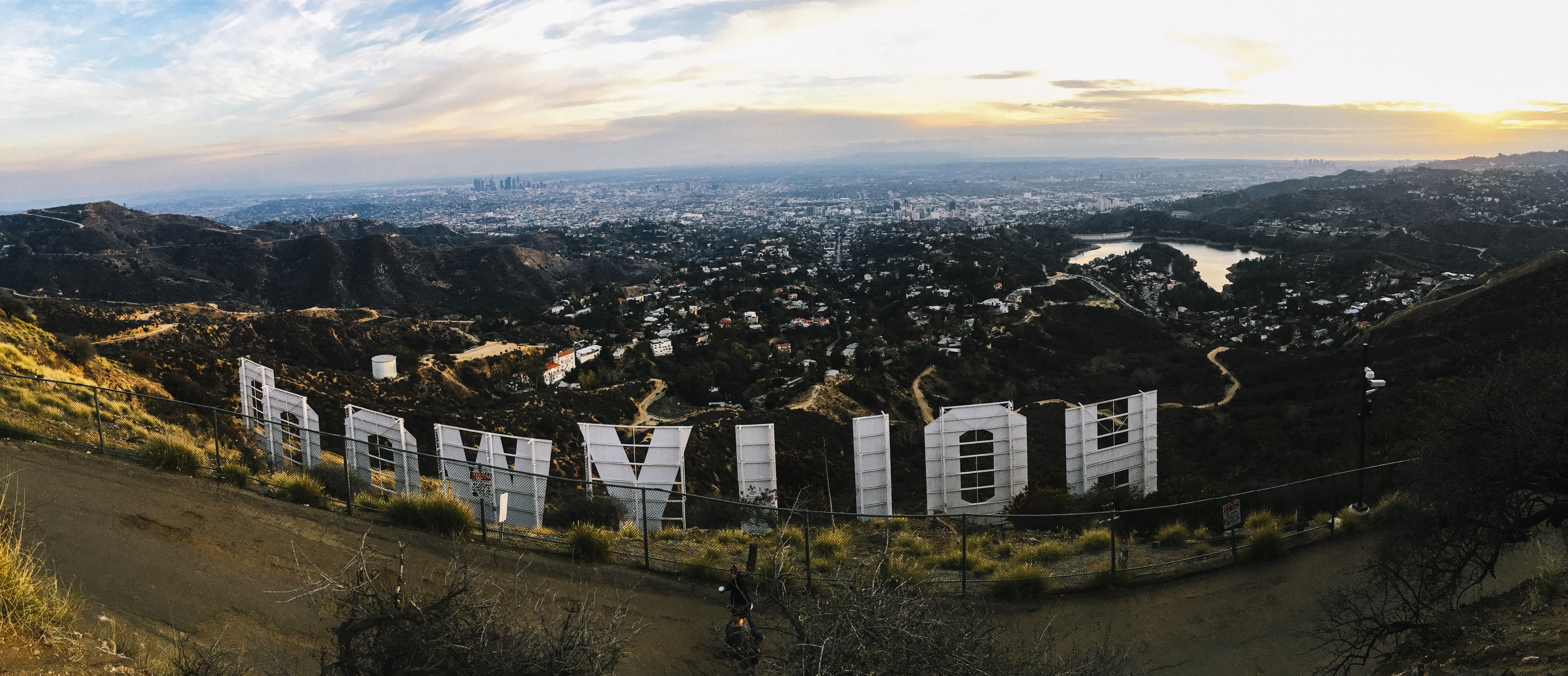
Once all wood, the sign was rebuilt in metal letters supported by a structural steel framework.

The sign's unprotected wood-and-sheet-metal structure deteriorated over the years. After a severe windstorm on February 10, 1978, the first O was splintered and broken, resembling a lowercase u, and the third O had fallen down completely, leaving the now-dilapidated sign reading "HuLLYWO D"

In 1978, the Chamber set out to replace the severely deteriorated sign with a more permanent structure. Nine donors gave US$27,778 each (totaling US$250,000, equivalent to $1,230,000 in 2025) to sponsor replacement letters, made of steel supported by steel columns on a concrete foundation.

The new letters were 44 ft (13.4 m) tall and ranged from 31 to 39 ft (9.4 to 11.9 m) wide. The new version of the sign was unveiled on November 11, 1978, as the culmination of a live CBS television special commemorating the 75th anniversary of Hollywood's incorporation as a city.

Refurbishment, donated by Bay Cal Commercial Painting, began in November 2005 as workers stripped the letters back to their metal base and repainted them white.

==== Donors ====
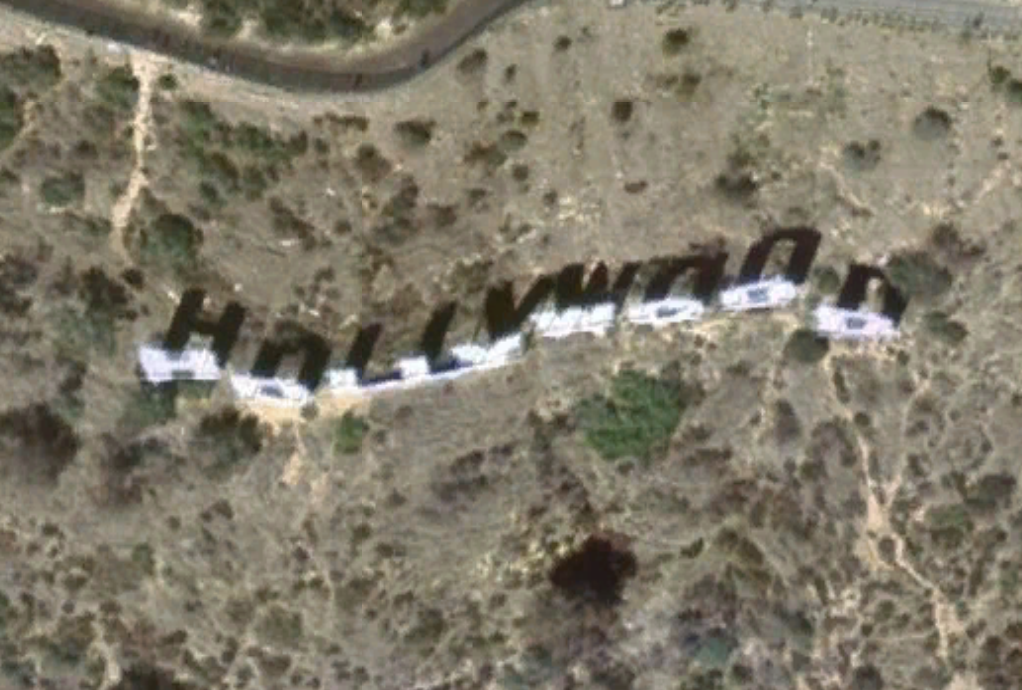
A satellite image shows it follows the contour of the hillside.

Following the 1978 public campaign to restore the sign, the following nine donors gave $27,700 each (which totaled $249,300):

- H: Terrence Donnelly (publisher of the Hollywood Independent Newspaper)
- O: Giovanni Mazza (Italian movie producer, co-founder of Panaria Film)
- L: Les Kelley (founder of Kelley Blue Book)
- L: Gene Autry (actor)
- Y: Hollywood Chamber of Commerce in honor of Hugh Hefner (founder of Playboy)
- W: Andy Williams (singer)
- O: Warner Bros. Records, currently known as Warner Records
- O: Alice Cooper (singer), who donated in memory of comedian Groucho Marx
- D: Dennis Lidtke (businessman, graphics company Gribbitt), donated in the name of Matthew Williams

==== The original sign and restoration of the "H" ====
The original 1923 sign was presumed to have been destroyed until 2005, when it was put up for sale on eBay by producer/entrepreneur Dan Bliss. It was sold to artist Bill Mack, who used the sheet metal as a medium to paint the likenesses of stars from the Golden Age of Hollywood. In August 2012, Mack constructed an exact replica of the letter H from the metal. On August 9, 2012, Herb Wesson and Tom LaBonge of the Los Angeles City Council presented Mack with a Certificate of Recognition for his restoration efforts and preservation of the sign.

=== Access issues ===
Considerable public concern has arisen over certain access points to the trails leading to the sign that are in residential areas. Some residents of the neighborhoods adjoining the sign, such as Beachwood Canyon and Lake Hollywood Estates, have expressed concerns about the congestion and traffic caused by tourists and sightseers attracted to the sign. The Los Angeles Times reported in 2013 that "there are more than 40 tour companies running buses and vans in and out of the canyon..." and residents "...are most concerned about safety issues because the curving hillside roads were not designed for so many cars and pedestrians." The Los Angeles Fire Department identifies Griffith Park, where the sign resides, as a high fire risk area due to the brush and dry climate. Local residents have created fake "no access" and other misleading signs to discourage people from visiting the sign.

In 2012, at the behest of residents of the Hollywood Hills, Los Angeles City Councilman Tom LaBonge petitioned GPS manufacturers Garmin and Google Maps to redirect traffic away from residential streets, which lack the infrastructure (e.g., parking, restrooms, potable water) to deal with the large influx of tourists, towards two designated viewing areas, Griffith Observatory and the Hollywood and Highland Center. The Hollywood Sign Trust, the nonprofit that maintains the sign, also endorses these two viewing platforms. Other mapping services, such as Apple Maps and Bing Maps, have subsequently followed suit. This was considered deceptive by some as the hike from Griffith Observatory could take up to two hours one way, and both locations are considerably farther away from other viewing locations or trails.

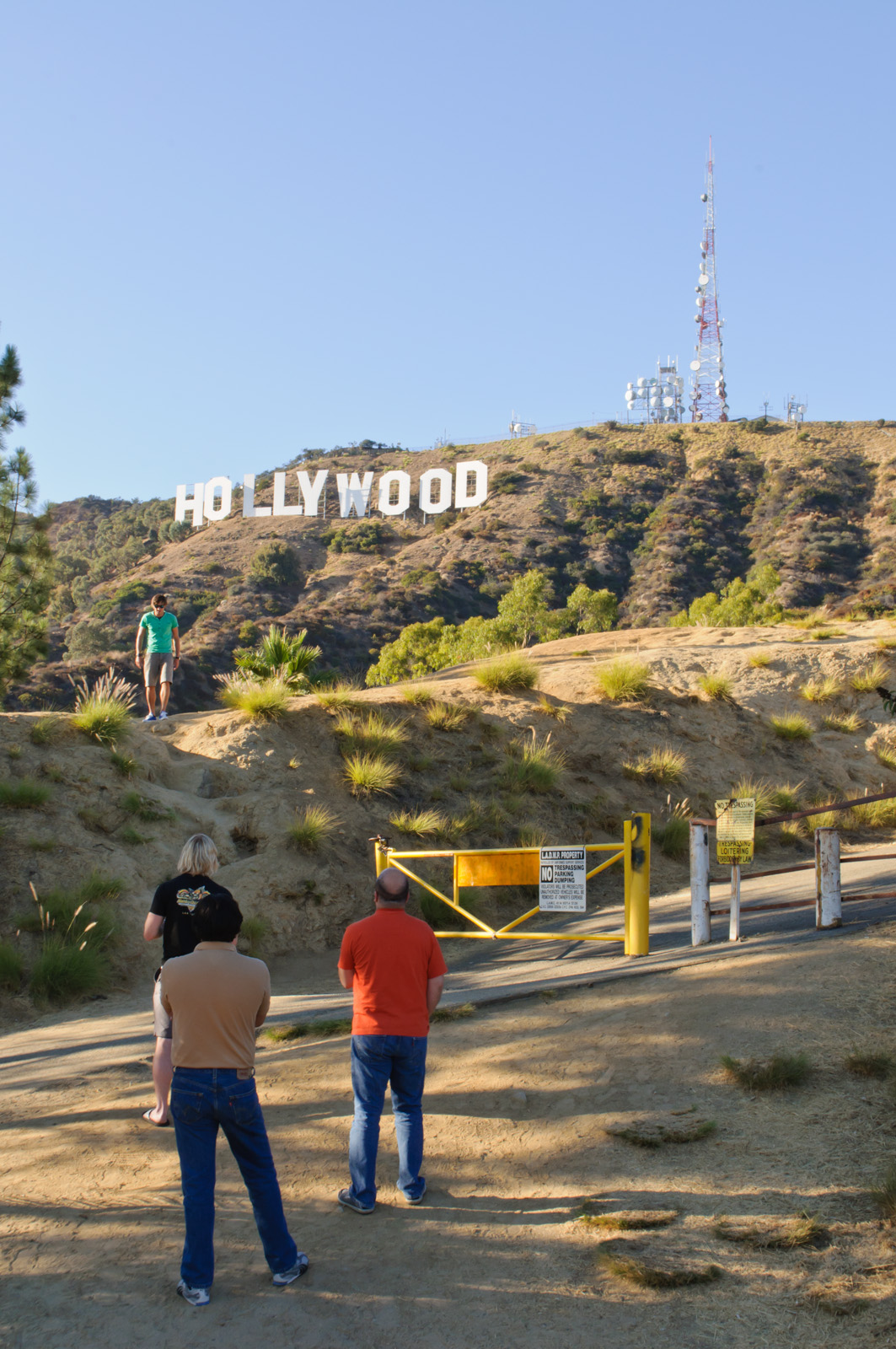
A walking trail at the edge of a residential canyon. This is the closest point most people will ever get to the Hollywood Sign. As signs indicate, public access from here to the sign is prohibited.

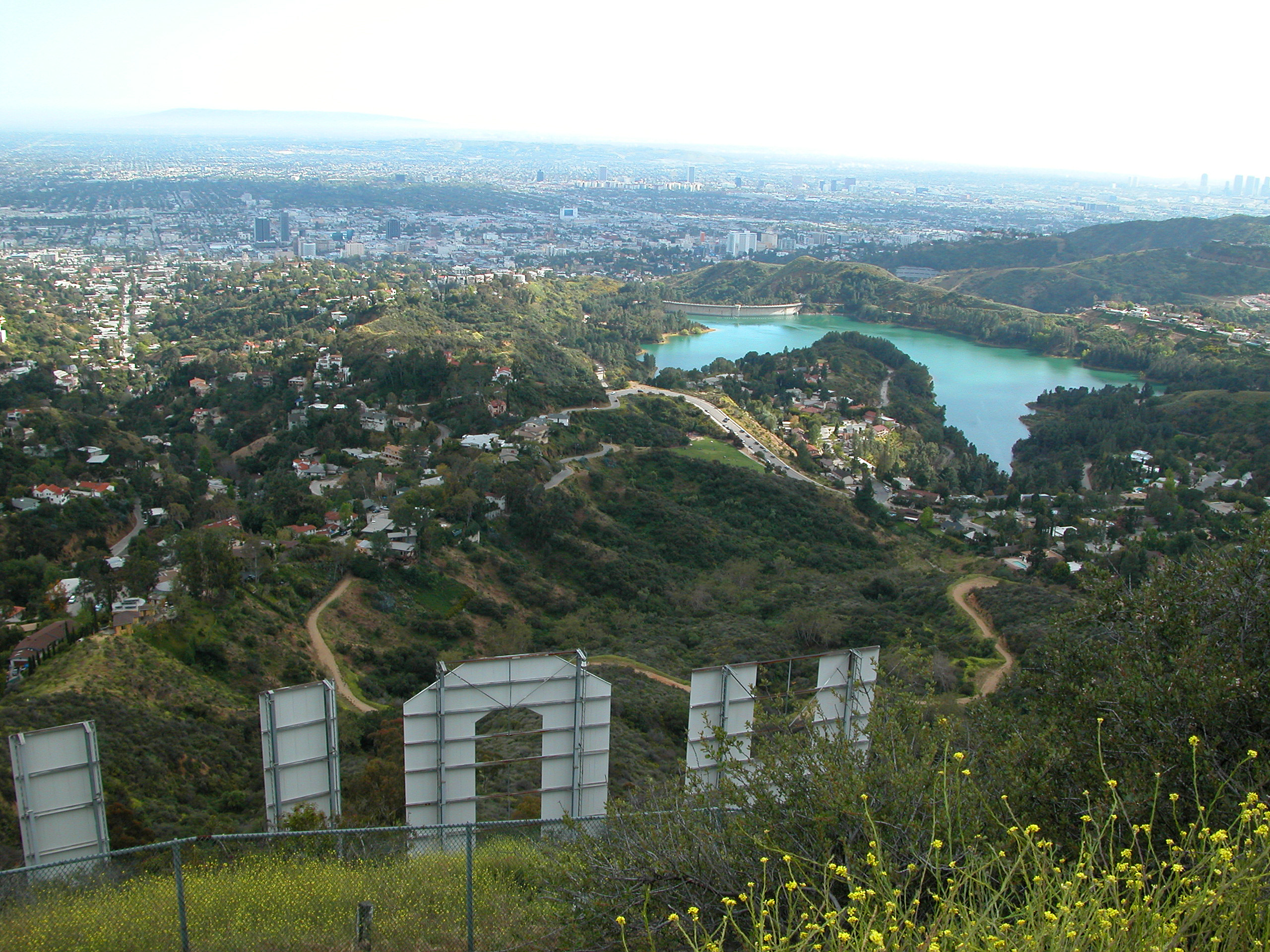
View from behind the Hollywood sign, 2003

In 2015, the city made the northern parts of Beachwood Canyon into preferential parking districts, restricting parking on most of the streets in the neighborhood only to its residents.

In 2017, Beachwood Drive gate, an access point to the popular Hollyridge Trail, was closed to the public by city officials, though it remains accessible as an exit. The closure came as a response to a lawsuit by Sunset Ranch Hollywood Stables against the city for advertising a gate at the bottom of the trail, which directed tourists towards the Ranch's "exclusive easement (right of way) road". The Los Angeles County Superior Court ruled that although the path was open to the public, the proliferation of its access by the city had interfered with the Ranch's business; thus the city was ordered either to provide access near the start of the easement or reopen a previously closed trail. A spokesperson from the office of Councilman David Ryu, who succeeded Tom Labonge, stated that it was uncertain that the city could have kept the gate open while still complying with court orders.

The Friends of Griffith Park, Los Feliz Oaks Homeowners Association, and the Griffith J. Griffith Charitable Trust filed a suit together to reverse the closing of the Beachwood Gate following its closure in 2017. The court ruled in favor of Los Angeles and denied their 2018 appeal.

In 2011, The New York Times wrote about how GPS is making the close-up vistas more accessible. The article featured a photograph of visitors at the closest Hollywood Sign viewpoint, The Last House on Mulholland.

An aerial tramway to the top of Mount Lee and the sign has been proposed numerous times. In June 2018, Warner Bros. proposed to fund an estimated $100 million tramway that would run from its Burbank studio lot and up the north face of Mount Lee to a new visitors' area near the sign. Other proposals stakeholders have set forth include establishing an official visitors' center for the sign, public shuttle service to lead tourists to the sign or trails, or even erecting a duplicate sign on the opposite side of Mount Lee. A Visitor Center was proposed by the Hollywood Sign Trust in late 2025. They featured concept renderings to the media but divulged no further information, financing, location or costs.

== Location ==
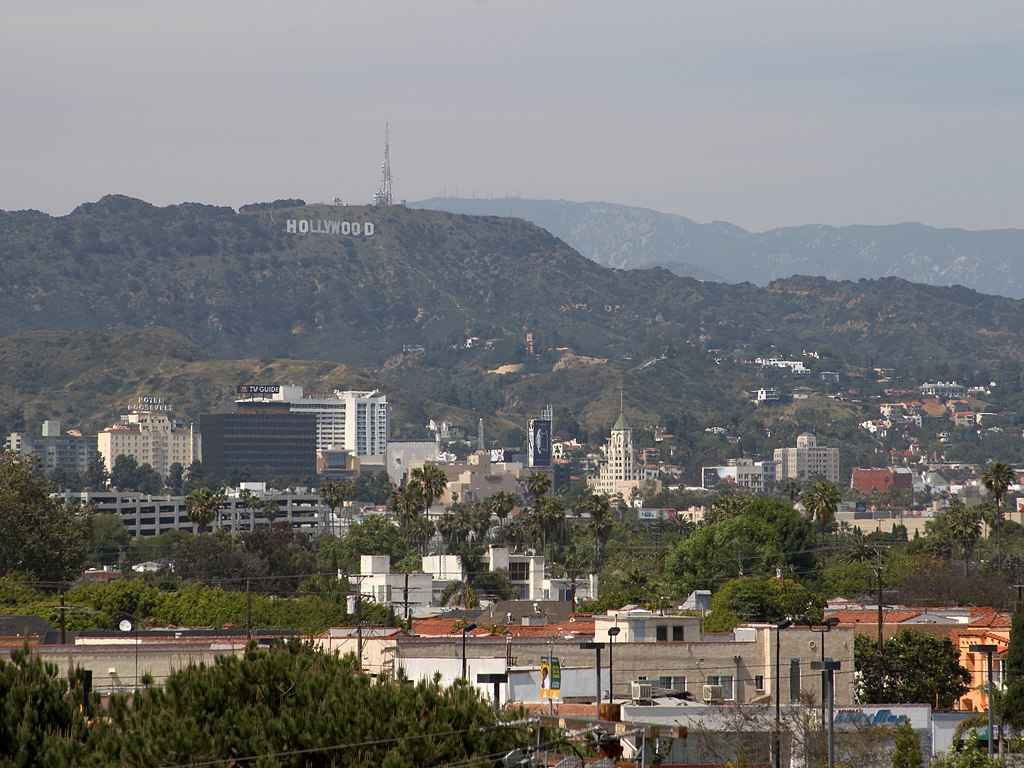
View from West Hollywood, near Santa Monica Boulevard, a few blocks south of Hollywood Boulevard. The historic Hollywood Roosevelt Hotel is visible on the left.

The sign is on the southern side of Mount Lee in Griffith Park, north of the Mulholland Highway, and to the south of the Forest Lawn Memorial Park (Hollywood Hills) cemetery.

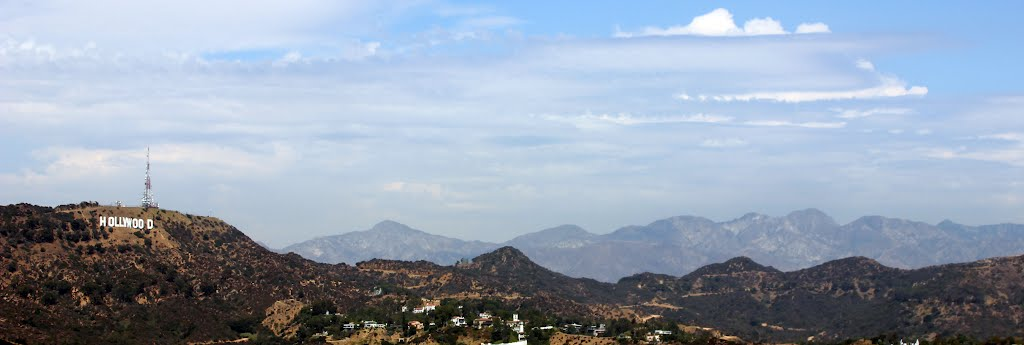
Hollywood Sign from Runyon Canyon Park, San Gabriel Mountains in the background

The sign is on rough, steep terrain, and there are barriers to prevent unauthorized access. In 2000, the Los Angeles Police Department installed a security system featuring motion detection and closed-circuit cameras. Any movement in the marked restricted areas triggers an alarm that notifies the police.

It is at an elevation of 1,578 ft (481 m).

The building and tower just behind and to the right of the sign is the City of Los Angeles Central Communications Facility, which supports all cellphone, microwave, and radio towers used by the Los Angeles Police Department, the Fire Department, the Los Angeles Unified School District, and other municipal agencies. The building has no name and is a large maintenance building for the antennae. From 1939 to 1947, this site was the location of the studios and transmitter of the first television station in Los Angeles, W6XAO (now KCBS-TV), founded by The Don Lee Network, hence the name Mount Lee. The TV studio left this location in 1948, and the transmission facility left in 1951, moving to the higher Mount Wilson.

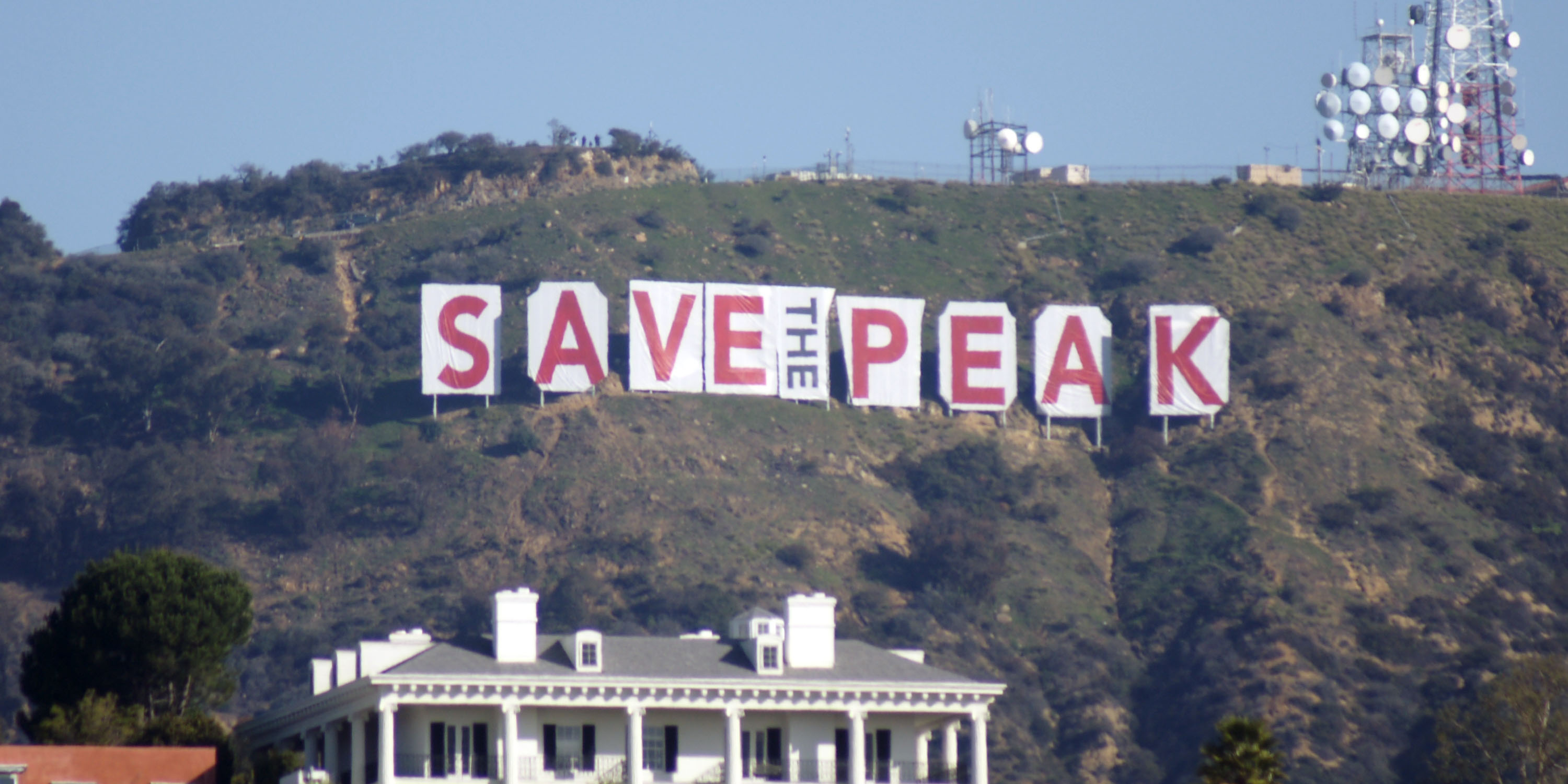
The sign in February 2010 during a donation drive raising money to preserve surrounding land

Land in the vicinity of the sign was purchased by Howard Hughes in 1940, who planned to build a hilltop mansion at Cahuenga Peak for actress Ginger Rogers. Before long, Rogers broke off their engagement and the lot remained empty. Hughes' estate sold the property that lies to the left and above the sign for $1.7 million in 2002 to Fox River Financial Resources, a Chicago developer that planned to build luxury mansions along the ridgeline. It put the property on the market in 2008 for $22 million. As a result, the City of Los Angeles considered buying it, possibly by raising money from celebrities as was done for the 1978 restoration.

Environmentalists and preservationists were concerned about the possibility of real estate development in the area. In April 2009 The Trust for Public Land (TPL) signed an option to buy the 138 acres (56 ha) property for a discounted price of $12.5 million. On February 11, 2010, as part of a campaign to help raise money and with the full support of both the city and the Hollywood Sign Trust, the organization covered each letter of the sign with large banners reading "SAVE THE PEAK". On April 26, 2010, the Trust for Public Land announced it had raised enough money, with Playboy magazine founder Hugh Hefner stepping forward to donate the final $900,000. Hefner later gave an additional $100,000 donation. After the purchase, the parcel became an extension of nearby Griffith Park.

== Alterations ==
The sign was illuminated as part of the 1984 Summer Olympics held in Los Angeles.

In 1987, promotion for the prime time launch of the Fox network had the sign read "FOX" for five days.

A 75 ft (22.9 m)-tall cutout of Holli Would, main character from the film Cool World (1992), which appeared to sit on the sign, was added as part of a promotion for the film. The alteration angered local residents, who said the cartoon character was "appalling" and an insult to women.

As part of the Los Angeles County millennium celebrations, the Hollywood sign was illuminated and hosted a laser show for a television broadcast for the arrival of the year 2000. The event was produced by Carl Bendix. The sign was illuminated in various colors, one of the rare times the sign became lit; an alternative to the firework displays at several of the other world icons due to concerns about fire in the dry conditions.

Between February 14 and 16, 2022, the sign read "RAMS HOUSE" to celebrate the Los Angeles Rams' Super Bowl LVI victory. The changes were made by the Rams in collaboration with the City of Los Angeles, the Hollywood Chamber of Commerce and the Hollywood Sign Trust. Inclement weather delayed its completion, leading to the sign reading "RALLYOUSE" for much of Tuesday, and was only completed just before the Rams' victory parade the following day. The sign was criticized for being unreadable, eliciting negative reactions on Twitter, but was nonetheless praised by some for being reflective of the team's performance in the run-up to the Super Bowl.

In 2022, the sign was lit for the first time in 22 years. Using laser projections, rainbow colors were cast onto the sign to commemorate Pride Month. A few days later, digital projections were beamed onto the sign on the weekend of June 25 and 26 for 2022's BET Awards. Digital projections were again used to light up the sign on September 17, 2026 to promote the opening of the new Fast & Furious: Hollywood Drift roller coaster at Universal Studios Hollywood.

The sign featured in a film shot for the handover of the Olympic Flag from Paris to Los Angeles (the host of the 2028 Summer Olympics) at the 2024 Summer Olympics closing ceremony. In it, Tom Cruise is depicted free climbing the sign and altering it to feature the Olympic Rings in the double Os.

On October 30, 2024, the letter "D" was illuminated blue with a white outline to commemorate the Los Angeles Dodgers winning the 2024 World Series.

=== Vandalism of the sign ===
The sign has been unofficially altered several times, often eliciting a great deal of attention. The modifications have included:

- HOLLYWeeD – January 1976 and January 2017: The sign was first altered in 1976 by Daniel Finegood following the passage of a state law decriminalizing cannabis. The sign was altered again early on New Year's Day in 2017, likely as an homage to a new California law legalizing recreational cannabis which passed during the 2016 election and which became effective on January 1.
- HOLYWOOD – April 1976 and September 1987: The 1976 alteration was for Easter sunrise service, viewable from the Hollywood Bowl. The 1987 alteration was for Pope John Paul II when he visited; the second L was covered.
- GO NAVY – December 1983: A group of Midshipmen, with permission, covered the sign for the Army-Navy football game's first and only West Coast appearance.
- RAFFEYSOD – in 1985, an obscure rock band from New Orleans named the Raffeys altered the sign in an act of unauthorized self-promotion.
- OLLYWOOD – In 1987 the first letter of the sign was obscured to protest the perceived hero worship of Oliver North during the Iran–Contra hearings.
- CALTECH – 1987: Occurred on Hollywood's centennial (of its incorporation as a municipality), a prank by students at Caltech.
- OIL WAR – In 1990, the sign was changed to protest the Gulf War.
- PEROTWOOD – Supporters of Ross Perot in the 1992 United States presidential election briefly changed the sign in October 1992.
- JOLLYGOOD – 1993, unknown
- SAVE THE PEAK – February 11, 2010, the original letters were covered with a series of large banners reading "SAVE THE PEAK", part of a campaign by The Trust for Public Land to protect the land around the Hollywood Sign from real estate development (see above). As the changeover progressed, variations such as "SALLYWOOD", "SOLLYWOOD", and "SAVETHEPOOD" sprung up.
- HOLLYBOOB – On February 1, 2021, the sign was altered by the YouTuber Joogsquad and Instagram influencer Julia Rose to challenge censorship on Instagram.
- H🐮LLYWOOD – April 2, 2021: Los Angeles based band Junior Varsity put a cow face over the first "O" as a promotion for their single "Cold Blood".
- HOLLYW💊OD – On September 28, 2025, a group of six people hung a banner of a white and green pill over the second "O" as a way to promote the cryptocurrency site pump.fun.
- PUBLIC FIGURE — On September 25, 2026, dominatrix and performance artist Sabine Tautou mummified a nearly nude man directly to the Hollywood Sign for her performance Public Figure, 2026. She was detained and cited for trespassing.

=== Proposed ===
In 1996, Disney filed to put spots on the sign as a means of promoting its film 101 Dalmatians; however, the request was later rescinded.

Mayor Eric Garcetti signed an executive directive for a program to light up the sign on his last day in office in 2022. Mayor Karen Bass rescinded the order 10 days later because "there were concerns about the legality of the order".

== Trademark status and legal distinctions ==
The interplay between the Hollywood Sign as a city-owned landmark and the "HOLLYWOOD" wordmark as a registered trademark has been a source of persistent public and legal confusion.

=== Legal distinction ===
The core distinction is between the physical Hollywood Sign structure on Mount Lee (a historic site owned by the City of Los Angeles and not protected by trademark) and the stylized word "HOLLYWOOD," registered as a trademark by the Hollywood Chamber of Commerce for specific commercial goods and services. This has been described as a "visual trap": the landmark physically spells a word, and the trademarked word is designed to look like the landmark, creating an intuitive but legally incorrect assumption that rights to one extend to the other.

=== Scope of trademark registrations ===
The Chamber's "HOLLYWOOD" wordmark registrations with the United States Patent and Trademark Office (USPTO) are limited to specific international classes of goods, primarily Class 25 (apparel), Class 14 (jewelry), and Class 16 (printed matter). The Chamber does not hold registered trademarks for "HOLLYWOOD" in classes covering core entertainment and media services, including Class 9 (recorded media) and Class 41 (entertainment services).

=== Depictions of the sign ===
Under U.S. trademark law's fair use doctrines, depicting a real-world landmark in film, photography, or art to indicate a geographic location is generally not considered trademark infringement. The USPTO has stated that when "Hollywood" is presented as a depiction of the Hollywood Sign, it is perceived as ornamental and does not function as a trademark.

The Hollywood Chamber of Commerce has a long-standing practice of issuing cease-and-desist letters and demanding licensing fees for commercial depictions of this sign, but there is no public record of the Chamber successfully litigating a federal trademark case against a filmmaker or publisher solely for depicting the landmark. Analysts suggest that when creators do comply with these demands, it is often a business decision to avoid legal cost and uncertainty.

=== Historical context ===
In 2004, the Chamber applied to register the specific depiction of the Hollywood Sign itself as a trademark. The application was opposed by five major film studios (Paramount, CBS, Fox, Columbia, and Universal) and was ultimately abandoned by the Chamber. In later applications for the stylized wordmark, the Chamber's lawyers argued to the USPTO that the mark had "acquired a meaning apart from the geographic location," further delineating the wordmark from the physical place.

== Depictions ==
=== Imitations ===
Multiple other places have imitated the sign in some way.

- Springfield, the setting of the American animated sitcom The Simpsons, has a sign in the same style spelling out "SPRINGFIELD"; it first appeared in the 1991 episode "Flaming Moe's".
- System of a Down is an Armenian-American heavy metal band formed in Glendale, California, in 1994. On their album Toxicity, the Hollywood Sign is changed to "SYSTEM OF A DOWN", released on September 4, 2001. The neighborhood of East Hollywood is historically home to a large Armenian-American population.
- In the 2004 video game Grand Theft Auto: San Andreas and the 2013 video game Grand Theft Auto V, the fictional "Vinewood" includes a parody of the Hollywood sign.
- In May 2008, the Hollywood Chamber of Commerce licensed exclusive rights to Plymouth Rock Studios of Massachusetts to merge "Hollywood" with "East", creating Hollywood East, an industry trademark that represents the growing film industry in New England. The studio was planning to find a site in Plymouth, Massachusetts for the permanent installation of the sign.
- In 2009, a "Hollinwood" sign was erected beside the M60 motorway going through Hollinwood, Greater Manchester, to celebrate the City of Manchester's twinning with Los Angeles. The sign was erected during the night and then taken down by the Highways Agency, as it was considered a distraction to motorway drivers.
- In March 2010, authorities announced the Wellington Airport in New Zealand would erect a Wellywood sign on the hillside of the Miramar Peninsula. This was to reflect the filmmaking community in Wellington, notably Weta Digital, which produced effects for Lord of the Rings, King Kong, and Avatar. However, the proposed sign's widespread unpopularity with local residents persuaded the airport staff to consider alternatives. On July 27, 2012, the city erected a sign that reads "Wellington" with the last letters blowing away as a reminder of Wellington's ever-present wind.
- In November 2010, the Chilean municipality of Renca erected a sign high on Renca Hill that reads "Renca la lleva" ("Renca rocks", in Spanish).
- In 2010, in the hope of promoting new businesses in the town of Basildon in Essex, England, the Basildon District Council erected letters reading the name of the town alongside the A127 road at a cost of £90,000.
- In 2010, Paddy Power, a large Irish betting company, erected a 270 ft (82.3 m) wide and 50 ft (15.2 m) high Hollywood-style sign reading Paddy Power on Cleeve Hill near the regency town of Cheltenham, as part of a publicity campaign for Cheltenham Festival. It became the world's largest free-standing sign of its kind.
- In 2011, a 20-foot tall replica was erected on the hillside of Monarch Hill Renewable Energy Park in Pompano Beach, Florida and used as a stand-in for the real sign during the filming of Rock of Ages.
- Entertainer Dolly Parton has many times cited the Hollywood Sign as the impetus behind her own Dollywood theme park, telling Spin Magazine in 1986, "When I first saw the Hollywood Sign, I thought, how wonderful would it be if I could change the 'H' to a 'D' for the day".
- In 2014, Druskininkai, Lithuania opened a sign in the resort town to celebrate social media that was voted the most likeable by followers of the "Likeable Lithuania" campaign.
- In 2015, an album cover was revealed for hip hop musician Dr. Dre's third studio album, Compton in which the album's title imitated the vertical backside of the Hollywood sign. Compton is also the name of Hollywood's sister city.
- An imitation of the sign is located at Hollywood, County Wicklow in Ireland.
- There is an imitation of the sign above the Harbor in Keelung, Taiwan along the Huzi Mountain trail.
- An imitation of the sign exists near Szastarka in Poland.
- An imitation of the sign sits on Mount Tâmpa in Brașov, Romania which was mounted in 2004. Another stands beside Râșnov Citadel.
- An imitation of the sign is located in Marseille, France, in the north part of the city. It was erected in 2016 to promote the Netflix series Marseille.
- There is an imitation of the sign near Osage Beach reading "Lake of the Ozarks" which welcomes visitors. It was installed in 2012 and the sign is visible on westbound US Route 54 after crossing a bridge over the Osage River.
- There is an imitation of the sign in Medora, North Dakota. It is behind the stage of the Burning Hills Amphitheatre.
- There is an imitation of the sign in Anguillara Sabazia, near Rome.
- There is an imitation of the sign in at Westview Park in Winnipeg, on a hill known locally as "Garbage Hill".
- An imitation of the sign in Dildo, Newfoundland and Labrador, that reads "DILDO", and was a gift from Jimmy Kimmel.
- There is an imitation sign over the town of Hatta, United Arab Emirates.
- An imitation of the sign was erected near Palermo, Italy in 2001 as part of the Venice Biennale.
- There was an imitation of the sign near Kahramankazan, Turkey.
- There was an imitation of the sign near Kızılcahamam, Turkey.
- In 2022, the city of Dundee, Scotland installed a sign on the Dundee Law inspired by the Hollywood Sign which read "BEANOTOWN", a reference to the fictional location featured in The Beano as part of Dundee’s Summer Streets Festival which was themed after The Beano which is published in the city.
- In 2024, the city of Detroit installed a sign which was inspired by the Hollywood Sign in preparation of the 2024 NFL draft. The sign is located alongside I-94 at the western city limits.

=== In popular culture ===
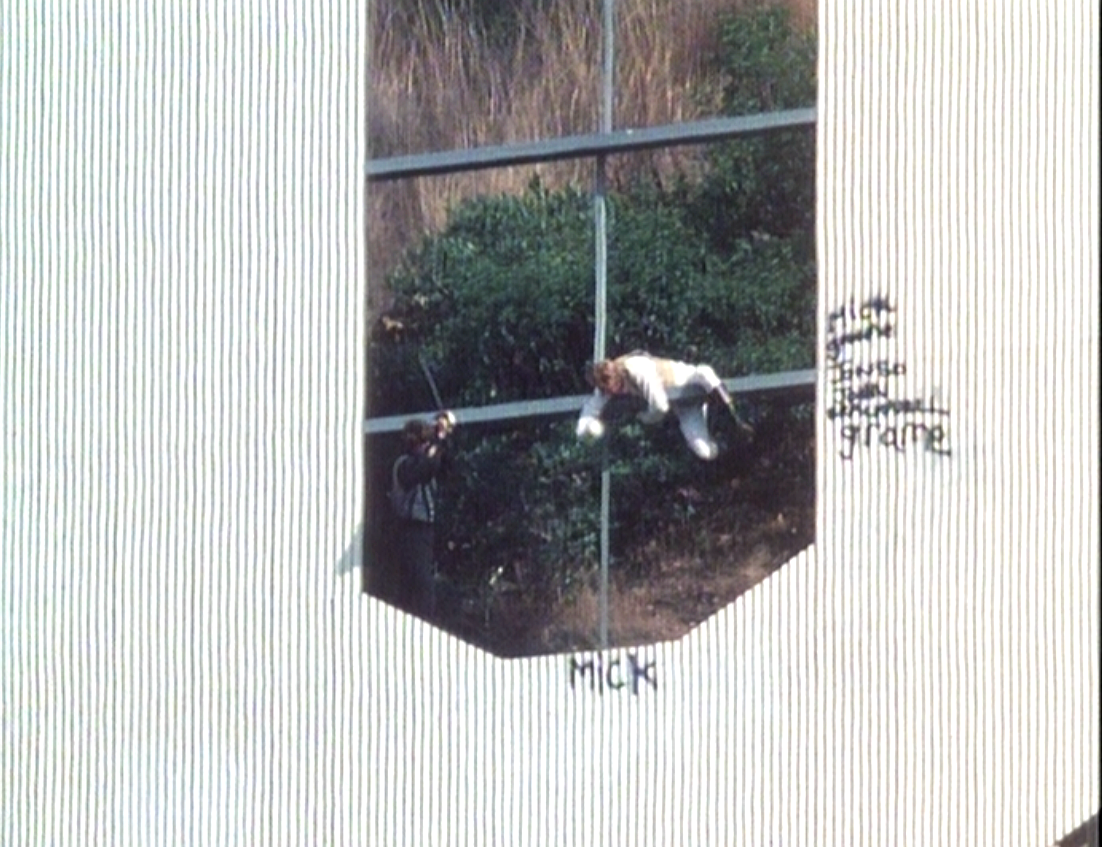
An episode of The Optimist, filmed in 1982, featured a swordfight shot in and around the sign.

In films and television shows, the Hollywood Sign is often used as an establishing shot for Los Angeles and Hollywood. The sign is also shown getting damaged or destroyed from the events of a particular scene; period pieces may show just the "LAND" portion of the original sign being destroyed. It is an example of national landmarks being destroyed, a common feature seen in many disaster movies to increase the drama and tension. It is frequently a shorthand device to indicate the destruction of all of Los Angeles or the state of California. The sign has been depicted getting destroyed in the movies Earthquake (1974), Superman (1978), The Rocketeer (1991), Demolition Man (1993), Independence Day (1996), The Day After Tomorrow (2004), 10.5 (2004), Logorama and Terminator Salvation (both 2009), Sharknado (2013), San Andreas (2015), Despicable Me 3 (2017) and numerous other films.

The sign is depicted in the Netflix animated television show BoJack Horseman. During the middle of season 1, the "D" in the Hollywood sign is stolen. No attempt is made to replace it, and the neighborhood is referred to as "Hollywoo" for the remainder of the show, until its finale when it is accidentally renamed to "Hollywoob".

The December 2013 issue of National Geographic features Steve Winter's photograph of P-22 in front of the Hollywood Sign.

In 2017, the architectural research initiative Arch Out Loud held an international ideas competition titled "The Last House on Mulholland," inviting designs for a hypothetical house on a vacant parcel on Mulholland Highway directly below the sign. Conceived as a "design charette," it drew roughly 500 entries from designers worldwide; the winning entry, "Ambivalent House," was designed by the Los Angeles firm Hirsuta.

In January 2026, a crew for the underwear brand Syrn, including actress and brand founder Sydney Sweeney, draped lingerie over the sign without a permit. The Hollywood Chamber of Commerce stated the stunt was unauthorized and investigated the incident.

== The Hollywood Sign Trust ==
The Hollywood Sign Trust is a nonprofit 501(c)(3) organization established in 1978 with the mission of preserving, maintaining, and protecting the Hollywood Sign, one of California’s most recognized cultural landmarks. The Trust has tasked itself with physical maintenance, repairs, refurbishment, and capital improvements of the Sign, in addition to securing it and educating the public about its historical and cultural importance.

In 2000, the Hollywood Sign Trust installed the first state-of-the-art surveillance system at the Sign. The system was modified in 2005 and again in 2022 and features security cameras, two way radios, and infrared cameras pointed at the Sign and its surrounding areas. The cameras are monitored by the Los Angeles Police Department.

The Hollywood Sign Trust has been responsible for the repainting and maintenance of the Sign. Most recently, they orchestrated the 2022 cleaning and painting of the Hollywood Sign. This was designed to be in conjunction with the 2023 100th anniversary of the Sign.

Other notable projects include the 2010 Trust for Public Land activation to raise funds to purchase Cahuenga Peak, the 80th (2003), 90th (2013), and 100th (2023) anniversary celebrations of the Sign, and the in-progress plans for a Hollywood Sign visitor center in partnership with the City of Los Angeles and Rec & Parks.

In 2023, the Hollywood Sign Trust was honored with the 2023 Preservation Award by the Los Angeles Conservancy, which recognized the Sign Trust’s exceptional achievements in the field of historic preservation in Los Angeles County.

=== Trustees ===
The Hollywood Sign Trust is made up of nine trustees nominated by the Hollywood Chamber of Commerce, the City of Los Angeles, and the Office of Los Angeles's 4th City Council district. As of 2024–2025, the board consists of Jeff Zarrinnam (Chair), Marty Shelton (Vice Chair), Brian Lane (Secretary), Andrea Conant, Jerry Neuman, Stefanie Smith, Darnell Tyler, Ed Tom, and Dana Pesce.

== See also ==
- Hill figure
- Hillside letters
- Outpost sign
