= Don Lee Network =

Early American regional radio network in the West Coast

The Don Lee Network, sometimes called the Don Lee Broadcasting System, was an American regional network of radio stations in the old-time radio era.

== Origin ==
Don Lee made a fortune as the exclusive West Coast distributor of Cadillac automobiles. He expanded into broadcasting by purchasing radio stations KFRC in San Francisco in 1926 and KHJ in Los Angeles in 1927. The stations were connected by telephone circuits and in December 1928 the Don Lee Broadcasting System was formed. Within a month, KMJ in Fresno, California; KWG in Stockton, California; and KFBK in Sacramento, California, had joined the network. By 1938, 28 stations were affiliated with the Don Lee network, making it one of the largest regional US radio networks (based on the West Coast) during radio's golden age besides the Yankee Network (at 27) in New England, the Texas State Network (between 23 & 24), the Intermountain Network (at 41) in the Mountain West, the Michigan Radio Network (at 8) in the Midwest (centering on Michigan), the Colonial Network (between 14 & 15) in New England, and the McClatchy Regional Network (with a core count of 5 stations, though would expand to 9 for temporary state-wide hookups) in Central California and Nevada.

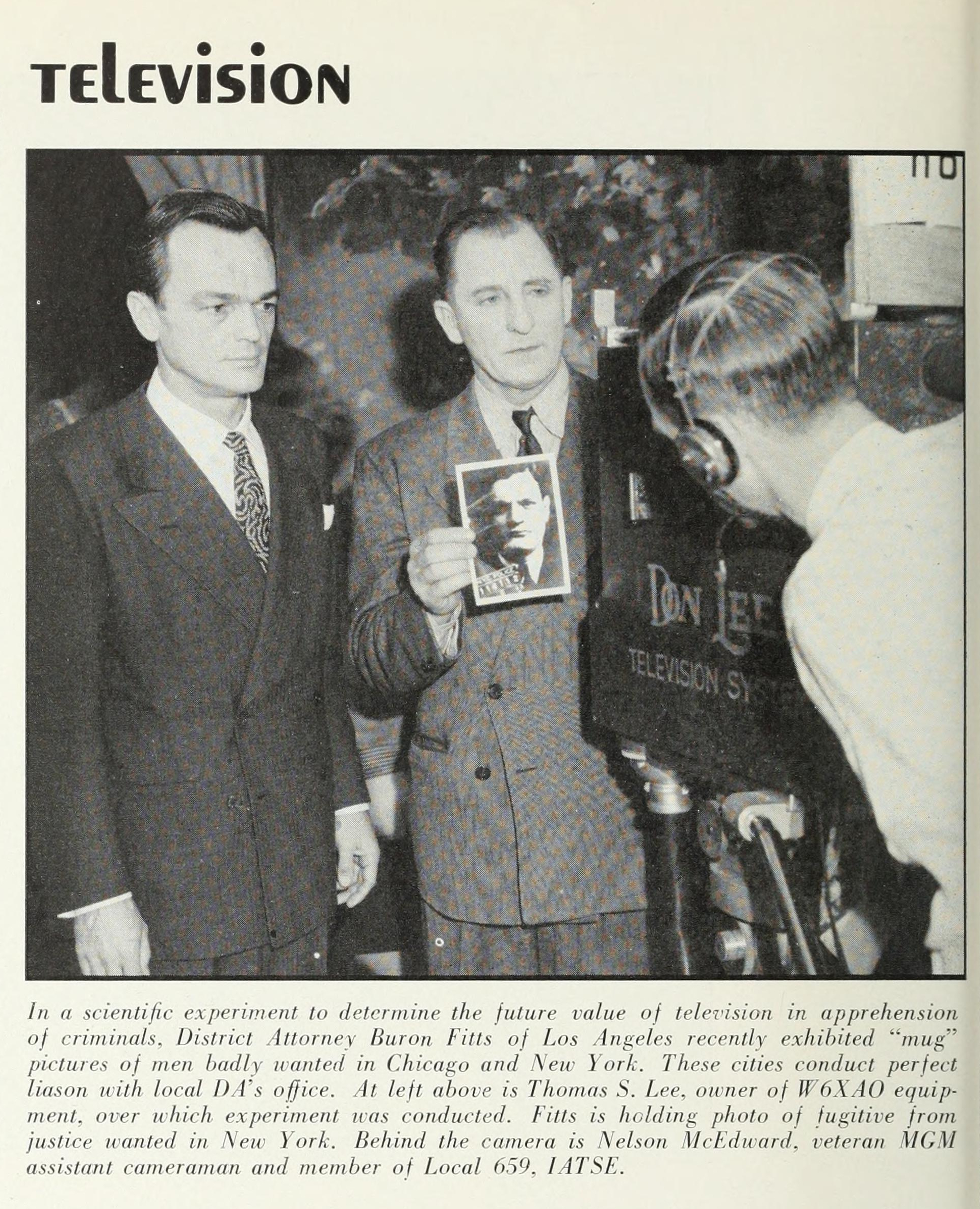
Clipping from International Photographer, January 1940

Lee died in 1934, leaving his son, Thomas S. Lee, to oversee the network's operation.

== Relationships with other networks ==
In 1929, Don Lee Network and CBS entered into an agreement that created the Don Lee-Columbia Network, making the Lee stations the West Coast affiliates for CBS. The joint operation was launched on January 1, 1930. A typical schedule had the network carrying CBS programs in the early evening. When those ended at 8 p.m. Pacific Time, either KFRC or KHJ provided network programs, with the two usually alternating evenings. Some of the programs originating at one of the Lee stations were also transmitted nationally by CBS.

After initial success and expansion, disagreement over programming autonomy for stations led to the dissolution of the agreement. Any hopes for continuing the Don Lee-CBS partnership vanished when CBS bought radio station KNX in 1936, making CBS a competitor of KHJ in the Los Angeles market. After the separation, some stations left to become West Coast affiliates of NBC. The stations remaining with Don Lee joined the Mutual Broadcasting System.

Affiliating with Don Lee Network enabled Mutual to go coast to coast across the United States. The change, announced on June 27, 1936, added Lee's California affiliated stations to those already connected with Mutual. The expanded Don Lee-Mutual network began operations on December 30, 1936. After that affiliation, Lee continued independent operations, transmitting only certain Mutual programs to stations on the Lee network. Elizabeth McLeod wrote in her article, "Local Voices: The Don Lee and Yankee Networks", that the arrangement "was the best of both worlds — the freedom and local flavor of a regional chain, combined with the resources, when needed, of a national hookup. This was the philosophy of Mutual itself, and it tied in well with the way Don Lee had always tried to do business in the past ...".

== Original programming ==
Bill Oates, in his biography, Meredith Willson - America's Music Man: The Whole Broadway-Symphonic-Radio-Motion Picture Story, noted:

During the early 1930s, before regular broadcasting flowed endlessly from coast to coast from the network hubs in New York, Chicago, and Los Angeles, and because of the time differences, West coast stations presented a great deal of network quality original programming for the Western divisions of NBC and CBS.

In 1929, Willson began working for Lee, taking on the responsibility of overseeing music "for a variety of network shows." Others who worked for Lee and went on to achieve national popularity included Don Wilson, Ralph Edwards, Art Linkletter, Harold Peary, Morey Amsterdam, Merv Griffin, John Nesbitt, and Bea Benederet. Mark Goodson created game shows for the network before becoming better known for his work with Bill Todman in producing game shows for television.

Programs that originated in the Don Lee studios included Blue Monday Jamboree, Queen For A Day, The Bill Stulla Show, Heart’s Desire, Don Lee Music Hall, Peter Potter’s Party, and The Jack Kirkwood Show. KHJ and KFRC each had its own organ, dance band, and symphony orchestra as well as artists, singers, and other entertainers, so that each station could provide "a variety with appeal to any audience".

== Television ==
The network experimented with television in the early 1930s, launching experimental station W6XAO in Los Angeles, California, on December 31, 1931. It broadcast one hour per day throughout the 1930s. In 1937, the TV and radio operations teamed up to broadcast the opening of the 27th annual Los Angeles Motor Car Dealers' Automobile Show. Don Lee also annually televised the Tournament of Roses Parade.

Harry R. Lubcke, an electrical engineer, was the director of the network's television branch. He helped to boost the audience for the new service by preparing and distributing plans that allowed industrious amateurs in the Los Angeles area to build their own television receivers. In 1939, W6XAO's transmitter (along with the studios) were moved to the top of Mount Lee, greatly increasing the range of the station.

World War II brought a halt to further development of television, although W6XAO continued limited broadcasts throughout the war. W6XAO was commercially licensed in May 1948, when it became KTSL.

The company later pursued production of TV programs. In January 1950 it signed William Dieterle to a long-term contract to produce and direct TV films with Don Lee Television providing financing and Blair TV Inc. distributing the programs nationally. It also contracted with Don Wilkie, son of John Wilkie (the first head of the U. S. Secret Service) for use of the elder Wilkie's files to develop stories.

== New building ==
In 1948, the Lee operations expanded into a radio and television complex valued at $2.5 million at Fountain and Vine in Hollywood. The 118,000-square-foot, three-story facility included 14 broadcast studios, four of which were sound stages that could each accommodate more than 100 musicians, with seating for 350 people in the audience. Simultaneous television broadcasts could be made from the four studios. A plate glass wall in the lobby allowed visitors to watch the network controller as he worked. The transmission site was moved a few years later from Mount Lee to Mount Wilson.

An undated article on the Hollywood Heritage Museum's website describes the building at 1313 North Vine Street as "Hollywood’s oldest surviving studio building designed specifically for television broadcasting".

Following the death of Lee in 1950, KTSL was sold to CBS and renamed KNXT in 1951. As KNXT's studios, the building was host in the 1950s to Johnny Carson's earliest television shows, Carson's Cellar, a local show that aired from 1951 to 1953, and The Johnny Carson Show on the entire CBS-TV network from 1955 to 1956.

It later served as the studio for Los Angeles' first education television station, KCET while the "Vine Street Theatre" co-located at the same address and purchased by ABC Television around 1967 and was used as the home of The Joey Bishop Show and, in the 1970s, as studios for The Dating Game and The Newlywed Game. The structure was purchased in 2002 by the Academy of Motion Picture Arts and Sciences as a site for the academy's film archive and the Pickford Center for Motion Picture Study.

== Owner declared incompetent ==
In September 1948, Superior Judge Harold B. Jeffery declared Thomas S. Lee mentally incompetent, appointing network vice presidents Lewis Allen Weiss—also the network's general manager—and Willet H. Brown as guardians of the estate. Lee was already confined to a sanitarium and had been found mentally ill at a hearing a month earlier.

== Sale ==
Thomas Lee died on January 13, 1950, after jumping from a 12-story building. His will specified that the broadcasting operations be sold, a process that began in May 1950. The radio network and its shares of Mutual stock were sold in November 1950 to General Tire and Rubber Company for $12.3 million. The broadcast properties were then merged into the Mutual Broadcasting System. The purchase helped to make General Tire the majority owner of Mutual, and Don Lee's assets became part of what would eventually become RKO General. It also included Hollywood studios estimated to be worth $3 million. KTSL was sold to CBS and is today's KCBS-TV.
