= Westview Park =

Park in Winnipeg, Manitoba, Canada

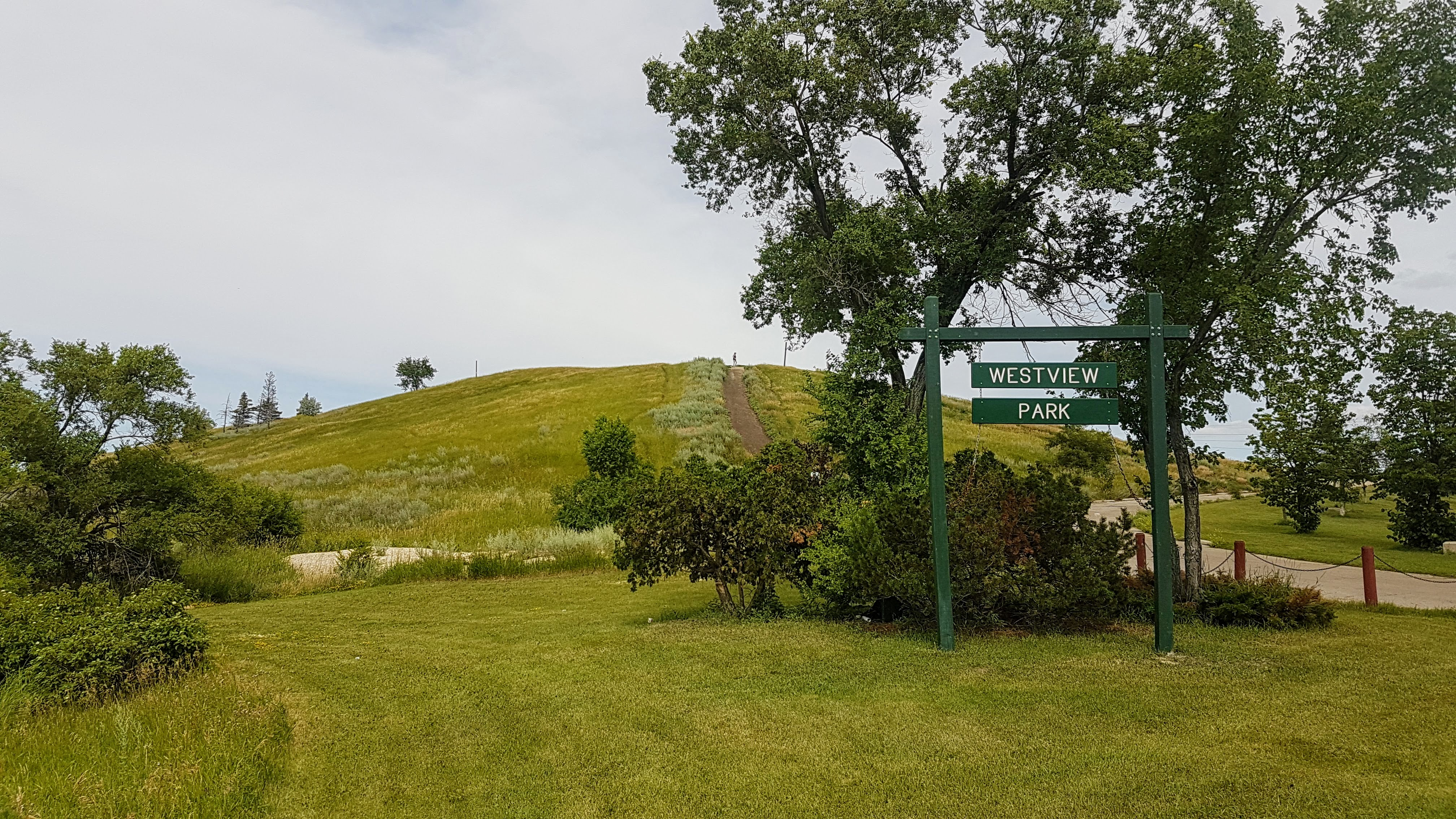
- Westview Park entrance sign
- Interactive map of Westview Park
- Location: 1 Midland St; Winnipeg, Manitoba; R3H 0H6
- Coordinates: 49°54′05″N 97°11′39″W

Westview Park is a park in Winnipeg, Manitoba, Canada. Colloquially known as Garbage Hill, the recreational park's prominent hill was built upon a garbage dump. The park is one of a select number of off-leash dog parks in Winnipeg, as well as a toboggan hill in winter, and commonly used for skiing, snowshoeing, cycling, running, and walking. The 28-acre (0.11 km^{2}) park has been planted with native grass and wildflowers.

The area has gone by many different names, including the Saskatchewan Avenue Dump, the Dump, the Big Green Hill, Lil's Hill, and Westview Hill Landfill.

The track up the south side of the hill is the steepest in the city, at approximately 22 degrees.

== History ==
The 10-acre (0.040 km^{2}) parcel of land was originally purchased by the City of Winnipeg in the late 1880s for use as a garbage dump, and dumping grounds for dead animals, manure, and sewage. The landfill primarily received ash and glass from Winnipeg's Henry Avenue incinerator. The city invested in a garbage incinerator in 1907 as an alternative to the dump, to allay public concerns of disease and pollutants leaching to a nearby creek. The hill had grown to approximately 60 feet (18 m) in height by 1942, and was deemed "full" and closed in 1948, with garbage being rerouted to a new incinerator on Henry Avenue.

The City of Winnipeg invested in a series of grading and landscaping improvements from 1953 to 1961 to reshape the dump for recreational use. These improvements cost a total of $125,000. The garbage dump was renamed to "Westview Park" on 15 February 1961. Original plans for the location included restrooms and a concession atop the hill. During the first few years of recreational operation, smoke would appear above the surface of the hill on occasion, due to the high temperatures deep within it, up to 150 °F (66 °C).

In 1998, the city erected a temporary snowboard ramp alongside the toboggan run. The two 6-foot (1.8 m) ramps were used as launch ramps for aerial jumps and landings. In 2010, fencing was erected additional fencing and as well as car tires as a protective backstop alongside the end of the hill used for toboggan sliding.

== Garbage Hill Sign ==
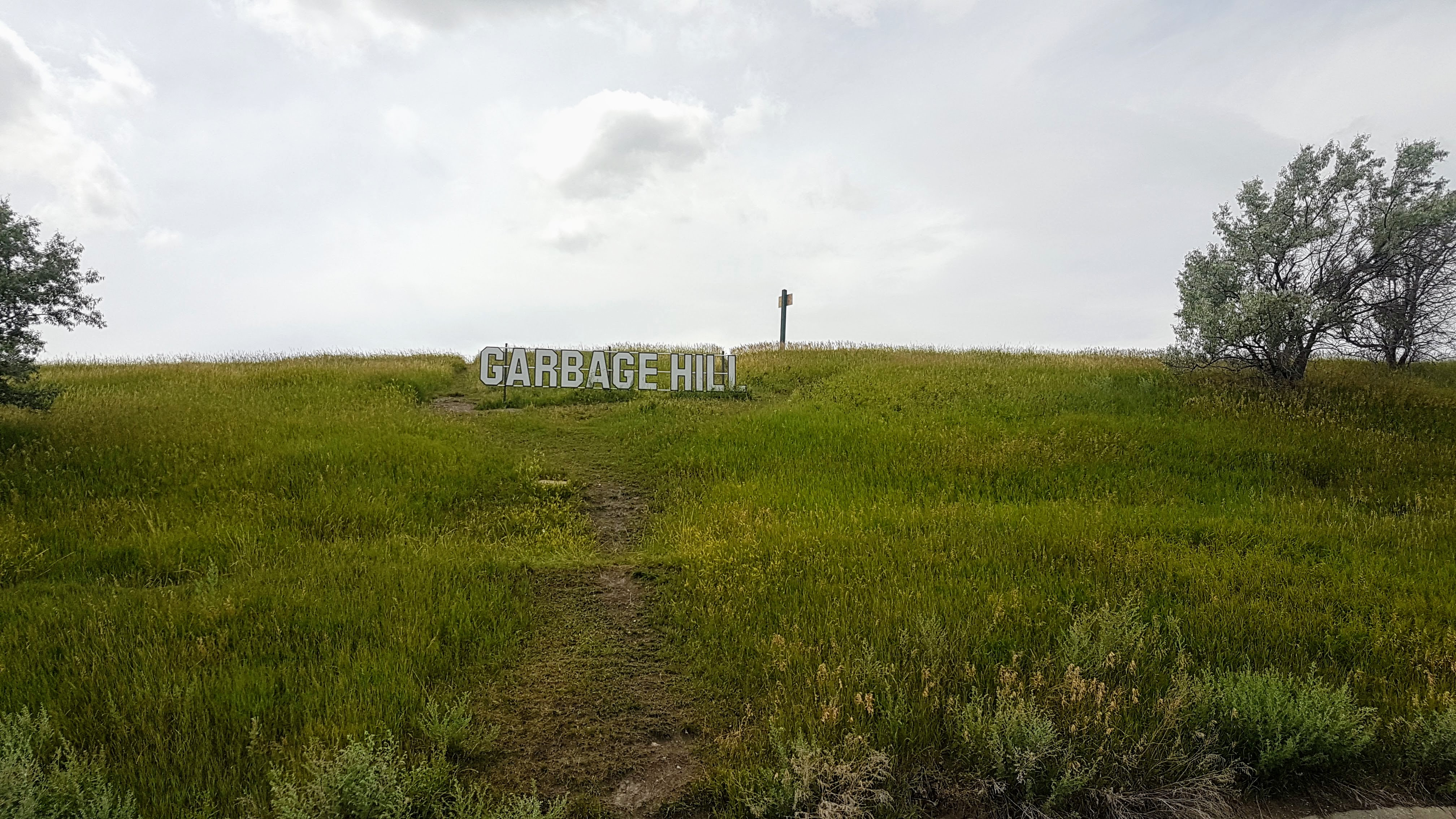
"Garbage Hill" sign on the side of the hill at Westview Park in Winnipeg

On 9 September 2018, a large sign was erected along the side of the hill, reading "Garbage Hill" in large block letters, styled similar to the Hollywood Sign. The sign was removed by city crews the following day. The prank received public support, including a petition with over a thousand signatures.

In December 2018, the City of Winnipeg unveiled a permanent version of the sign constructed by SRS Signs and Service, in collaboration with the semi-anonymous creator of the original sign, known only as "James".
