= Hollywood Chamber of Commerce =

Organization in charge of the Hollywood Sign and Hollywood Walk of Fame

- Established: 1921
- Location: Los Angeles, United States
- Region served: Hollywood, California
- President and CEO: Ron Frierson
- Chief Operating Officer: Dan Halden
- Website: hollywoodchamber.net

The Hollywood Chamber of Commerce is a chamber of commerce located in Hollywood, Los Angeles. As a local chamber, the organization promotes business interests in its area, but it is best known for holding the trademarks and licensing rights for two of Los Angeles's most famous landmarks: the Hollywood Walk of Fame and the Hollywood Sign.

== History ==
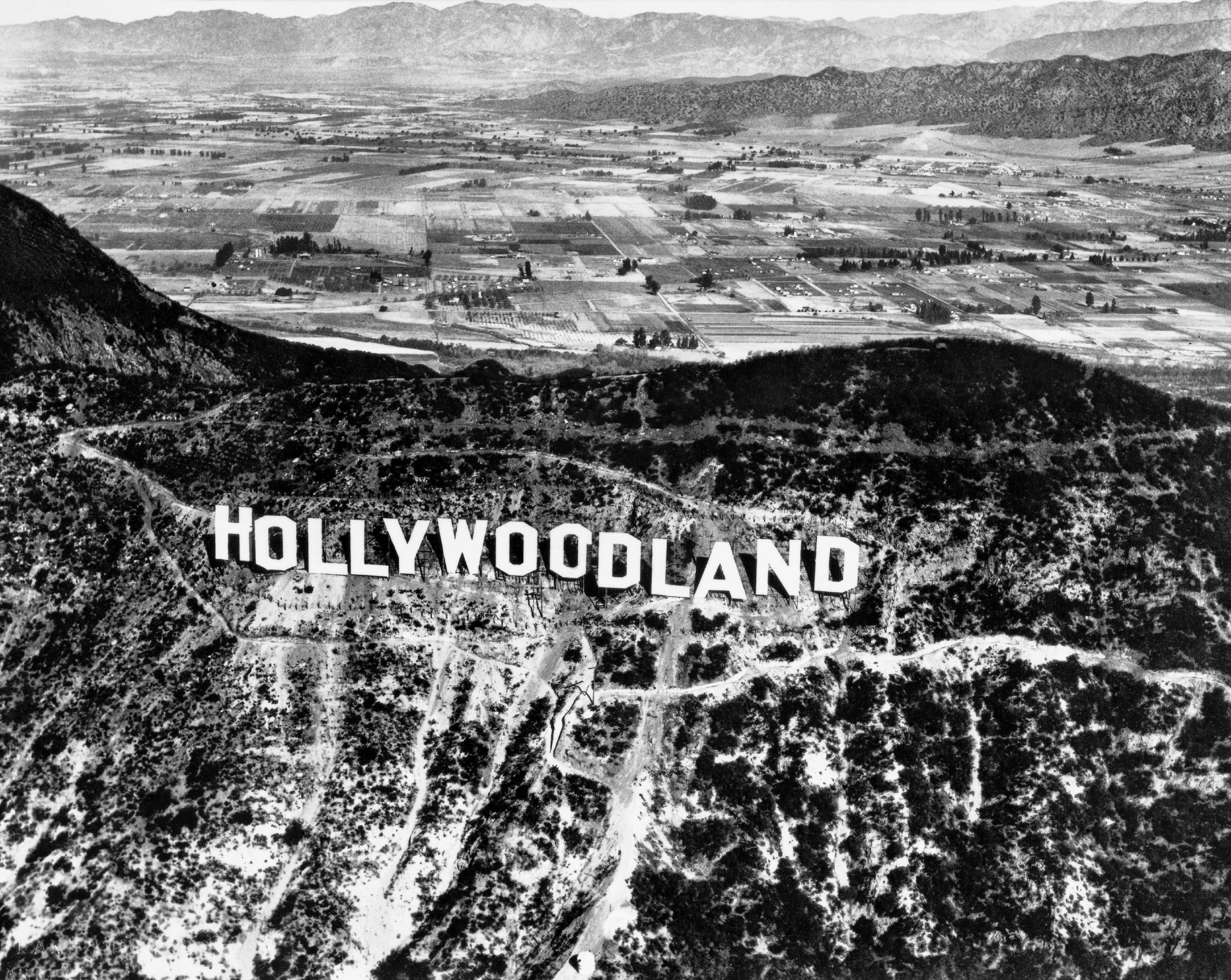
Hollywoodland Sign prior to the Chamber's modifications

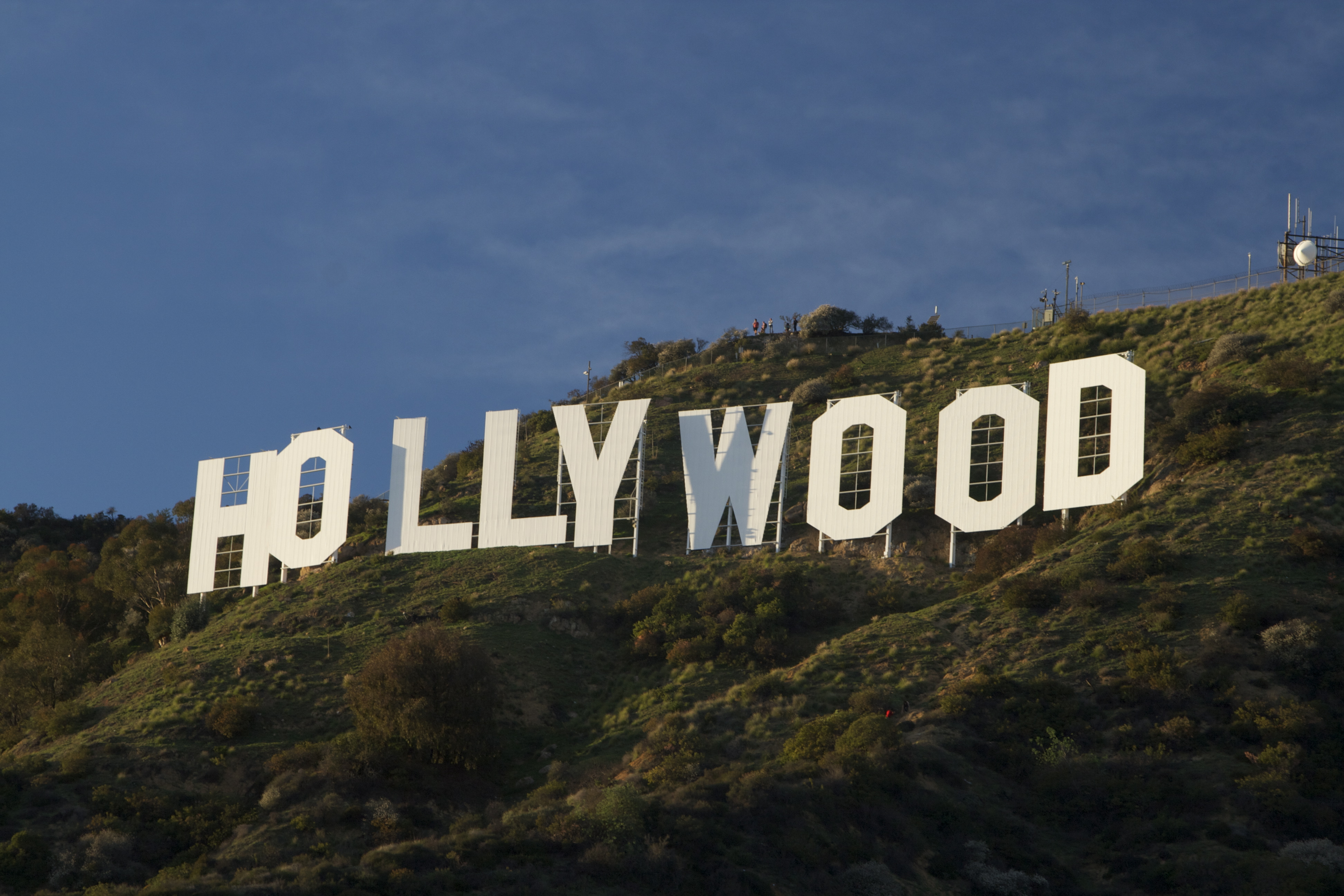
Hollywood Sign after the Chamber's modifications

The Hollywood Chamber of Commerce was founded in 1921, when Hollywood's 2,000 residents and businesspeople organized with the goal of becoming a more metropolitan city. A five-day membership drive resulted in 2,517 members, with their first order of business involving the fledgling Hollywood Bowl, in which they financed a ticket-selling campaign and also raised funds to grade and install 20,000 seats in the venue.

In 1932, the Chamber sponsored the Santa Claus Lane Parade, and in 1978, the parade was renamed the Hollywood Christmas Parade.

In 1949, the organization paid $4000 ($54,126 in 2025) to repair, rebuild, and take down the “LAND” in the Hollywoodland Sign, creating the Hollywood Sign. The Chamber did a second restoration in 1973.

In 1953, the organization's president proposed what would become the Hollywood Walk of Fame, which the chamber worked with the City of Los Angeles to create. The walk was dedicated in 1960, and in 1962, Los Angeles City Council approved an ordinance that specified the Hollywood Chamber of Commerce be the agent to advise the City in all matters pertaining to the addition of other names. The organization also hosts Walk of Fame induction ceremonies and places memorial wreaths beside stars upon their honoree's death.

Since 1978, the organization has owned the trademarks and licensing rights to the Hollywood Sign and the Hollywood Walk of Fame, the former through the Hollywood Sign Trust. Since then, the Chamber has upheld their trademarks through cease and desist orders and lawsuits.

In 1990, the Chamber ended a several year effort to restrict commercial use of the word Hollywood. Hollywood, Florida; Hollywood, New Mexico; and at least nine other communities and three local neighborhood groups opposed the effort.

In 1992, the Hollywood Sign Trust became independent of the Hollywood Chamber of Commerce; however, the Chamber appointed seven of the nine trustees and retained ownership of the Hollywood Sign trademark. And as of 2015, the Chamber continued to have a majority of the Trust's board seats.

As of April 2026, the president and CEO of the organization is Ron Frierson, a business and policy executive who prior to the Chamber worked at Amazon and also in the administration of former Los Angeles Mayor Eric Garcetti.
