= Bill Mack (sculptor) =

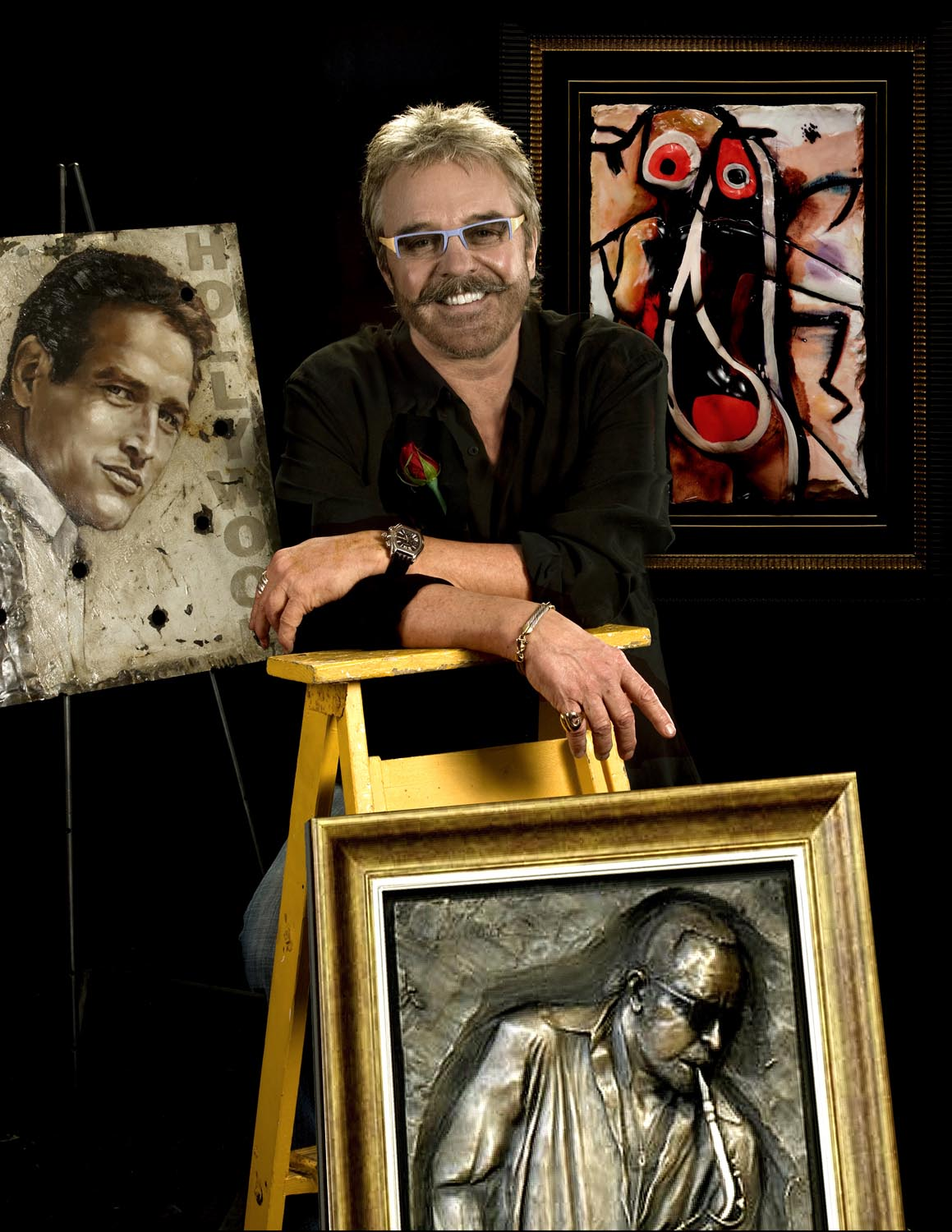
- Born: September 25, 1944 (age 82); Minneapolis, Minnesota, U.S.
- Occupations: Artist, painter, sculptor, collector of memorabilia

Bill Mack is a contemporary American sculptor and painter born in Minneapolis, Minnesota.

== Early life ==
Bill was born in Minneapolis, Minnesota. He attended the University of Minnesota and majored in journalism with a minor in art history while continuing to do commissioned work as a free-lance artist.

== Relief Sculptures ==
Mack's early background as a commissioned sculptor also included creating several full-round artworks. This ability has continued in his gallery work, and in the creation of several life-size or larger cast bronze sculptures for the Minnesota Twins' Target Field, Hazeltine National Golf Club, and corporate executive commissions.

Mack 's reliefs and full-round sculptures are in many major sports hall of Fame in America, including the NBA Hall Of Fame – Kareem Abdul-Jabbar, Baseball Hall of Fame – Harmon Killebrew, Figure Skating Hall of Fame – Peggy Fleming, Tennis Hall of Fame – Arthur Ashe, Cowboy Hall of Fame – Casey Tibbs, The Canadian and U.S. Hockey Halls of Fame – The Hobey Baker Award.

In 2020, College Hunks Hauling Junk found a relief sculpture of Ryan White in an abandoned storage unit. It is now hanging in the lobby of their corporate headquarters in Tampa, Florida.

== The Original Hollywood Sign ==
In 2007, Bill Mack and his company Erin Taylor Editions purchased the metal from the Original Hollywood Sign. The sign resided in the Hollywood Hills from 1923 until 1978 when it was deemed irreparable, put into storage, and replaced by the sign that stands in Los Angeles today.

Mack used the historic sign metal as his canvas to paint portraits of distinguished stars of Hollywood. During the process of painting on the metal, Bill Mack became determined to restore the 45-foot H from the Original Sign metal.

In 2012, Mack began the project to restore the H. For weeks Mack and his staff reviewed all of the photographs and other information available to determine which of the original metal panels in their inventory would be used. They then spent several months working with engineers and construction teams building a new structure for the H so it would be suitable for both touring and placement in a permanent location.

In August 2012, Mack completed the restoration of the letter H from the Original Hollywood Sign metal. On August 9, 2012, Herb Wesson and Tom LaBonge of the Los Angeles City Council presented Mack with a Certificate of Recognition for his restoration efforts and preserving the iconic symbol of Hollywood history.
