= Mount Lee =

Mountain in California, United States

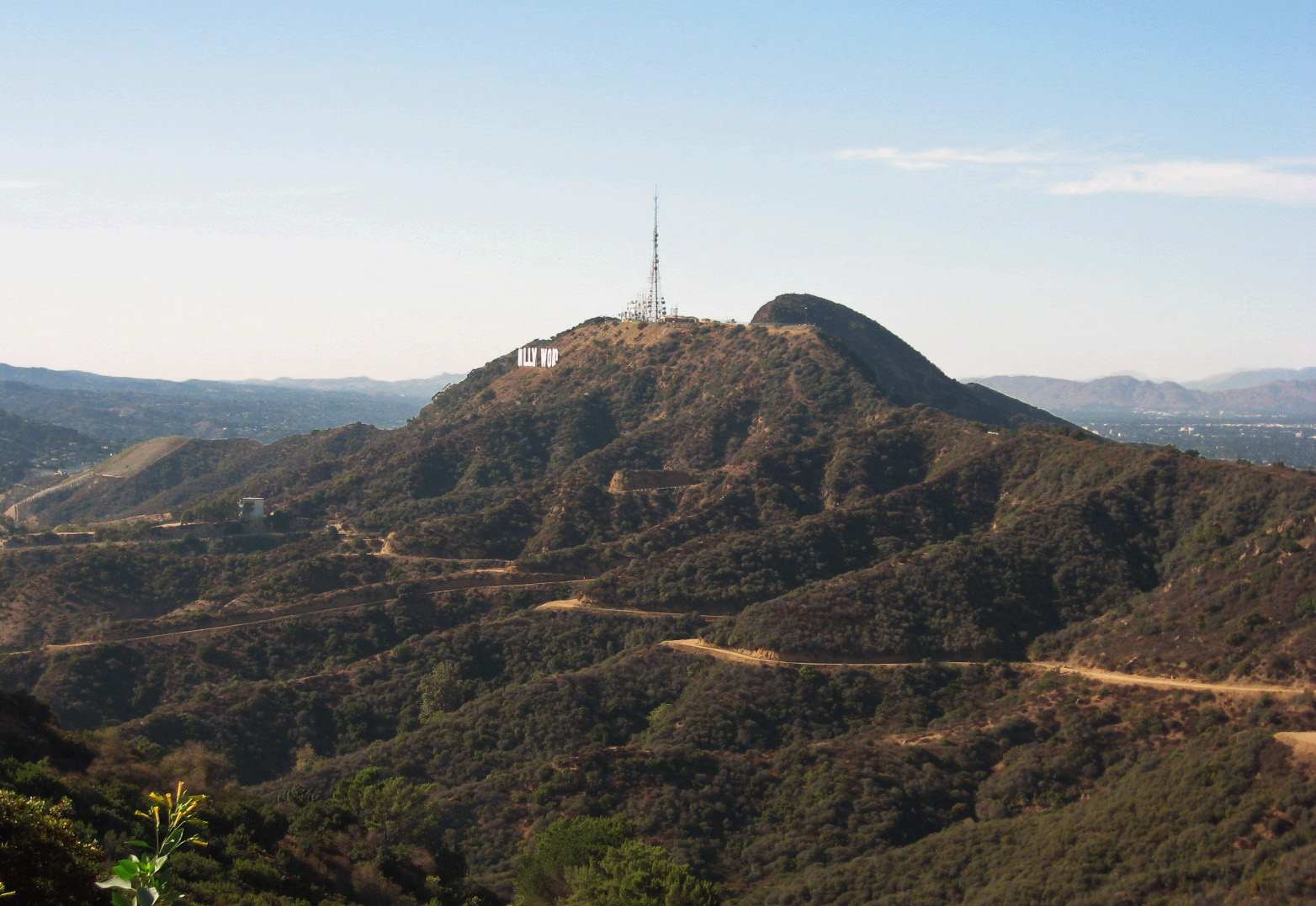
- Southeastern face of Mount Lee with the Hollywood Sign, 2006.

Highest point
- Elevation: 1,708 ft (521 m) NAVD 88
- Parent peak: Sandstone Peak
- Coordinates: 34°08′05″N 118°19′18″W

Naming
- Etymology: Don Lee

Geography
- Location within California
- Location: Los Angeles County, California, U.S.
- Parent range: Santa Monica Mountains
- Topo map: USGS Burbank

Climbing
- Easiest route: Hike

Mount Lee is a peak in the Santa Monica Mountains, located in Griffith Park in Los Angeles, California, USA. The Hollywood Sign is located on its southern slope.

== History ==
The original unnamed peak was one of the "three sisters" along with Cahuenga and Burbank peaks, the current flattened top being a result of silent movie pioneer Mack Sennett's unfulfilled plans to build an elaborate home on the property. To advertise the new Beachwood Canyon real estate development, the developers, including Sennett and Los Angeles Times publisher Harry Chandler, ordered a huge wooden sign built atop what is now known as Mount Lee. The mountain is named after early Los Angeles car dealer and radio station owner Don Lee. Lee, a one-time bicycle shop owner who became a protégé of Los Angeles pioneer businessman Earle C. Anthony, purchased his Los Angeles radio station KHJ from Chandler in 1927.

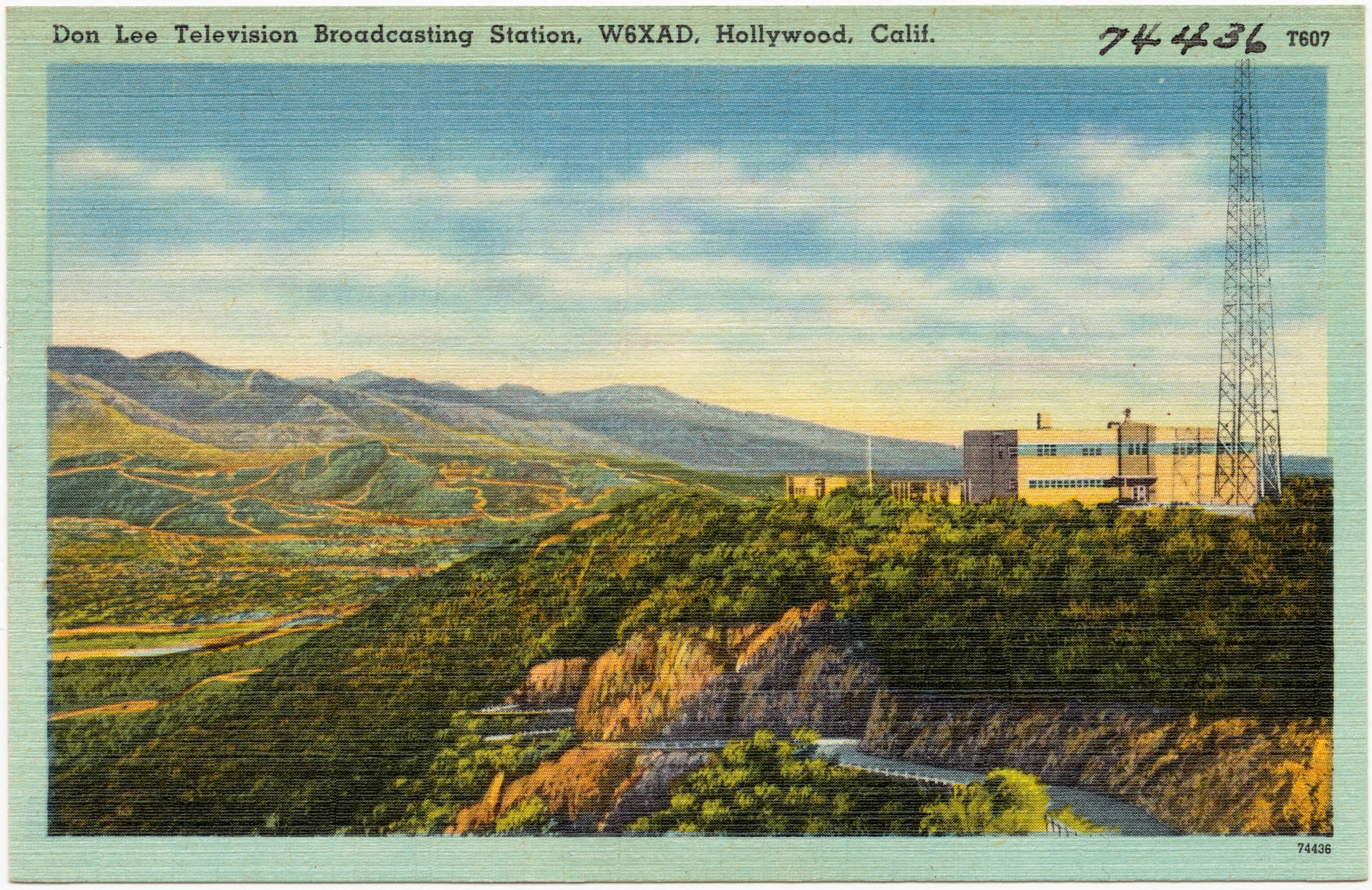
Postcard of the W6XAO transmitter on Mt. Lee

Four years later Lee began experimenting with television using call letters W6XAO. Studios were on the seventh floor of a building at Seventh and Bixel near his Cadillac dealership. A few years later, the transmitter was moved atop what is now called Mount Lee. An early reference to this name is in a June 1939 article in a magazine published by the California Chamber of Commerce: "Lee has bought a 20-acre site on a mountain top at the eastern boundary of Griffith Park, widening the transmission field of the Don Lee equipment to take in new thousands of homes in the Hollywood hills and the San Fernando Valley. The site is one and a half times higher than the top floor of the Empire State Building in New York. Mount Lee is thus the highest television location in the world. The transmitter is being rebuilt for installation on the mountain."

According to Wikimapia the immediate seller was not the original development company, but Sennett personally, "who wasn't doing too well in the post-silent Hollywood era and really needed the money." Lee was the first of what would become three Los Angeles television pioneers. The others were Paramount Studios' W6XYZ (later called KTLA) and Lee's mentor Earle C Anthony's W6XEA (later called KSEE, KFI-TV, KHJ-TV, and now operating as KCAL-TV). Lee's W6XAO eventually became KTSL – standing for Thomas S. Lee, who had succeeded to his father's position when Don Lee died in 1934. KTSL was purchased by CBS in 1950 and became KNXT, today's KCBS-TV.

Lee's television head was Harry Lubcke. Paramount had Klaus Landsburg and Anthony had the KFI radio dual chief engineer team, Headly Blatterman and George Mason. All three recognized that television signals from Mount Lee and similar points were inadequate to reach the greater Los Angeles basin, and they needed a point overlooking the entire area. Part of Mount Lee was then sold to Howard Hughes, who intended to erect an estate for his then-current love interest, Ginger Rogers. However, the Hughes-Rogers relationship soured, and the mansion was never built.

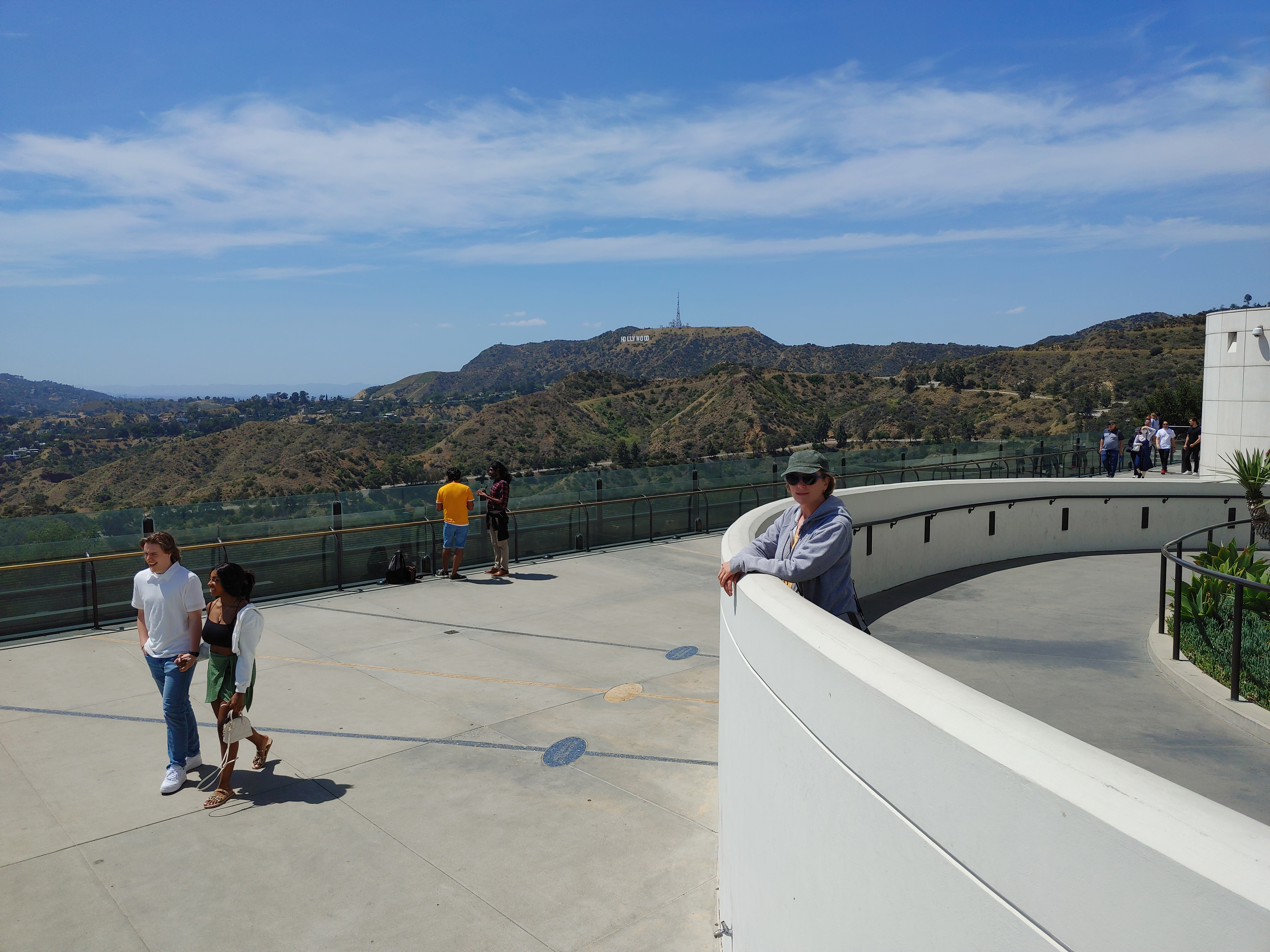
View of Mount Lee and the Hollywood sign from Griffith Observatory

After utilization during the war by the U.S. Army, the property remained an idle asset for decades, and eventually became part of the Hughes estate. Meanwhile, the three Los Angeles television pioneers were scouting out a more suitable location. Television experimentation was slowed considerably during the war but post-war preparations continued. The new site was code named "Mt. Anthony" in KFI-AM house organs of the day. After hostilities ended it turned out that Mt. Anthony was really Mt. Wilson – which is now the site of most Los Angeles FM and television stations due to its superior height.

Mount Lee continues to be the site of various non-commercial radio activities, but television transmissions ceased from that location in October 1951.

In 2002, the Hughes estate sold 138 acres (56 ha) of their Mount Lee holdings to a group of Chicago investors. This opened up the possibility of development of four residential buildings adjacent to the sign. Many Angelenos, especially those in the movie industry, felt this would be sacrilege. A successful effort was mounted in 2010 to raise funds to purchase the land and add it to the adjacent Griffith Park.

The large tower atop Mount Lee today is owned and operated by the City of Los Angeles. It sits on the same site as the original W6XAO tower and possibly has remnants of the original structure. Smaller tenants on the site have included some federal government and amateur radio users.

== Hiking ==
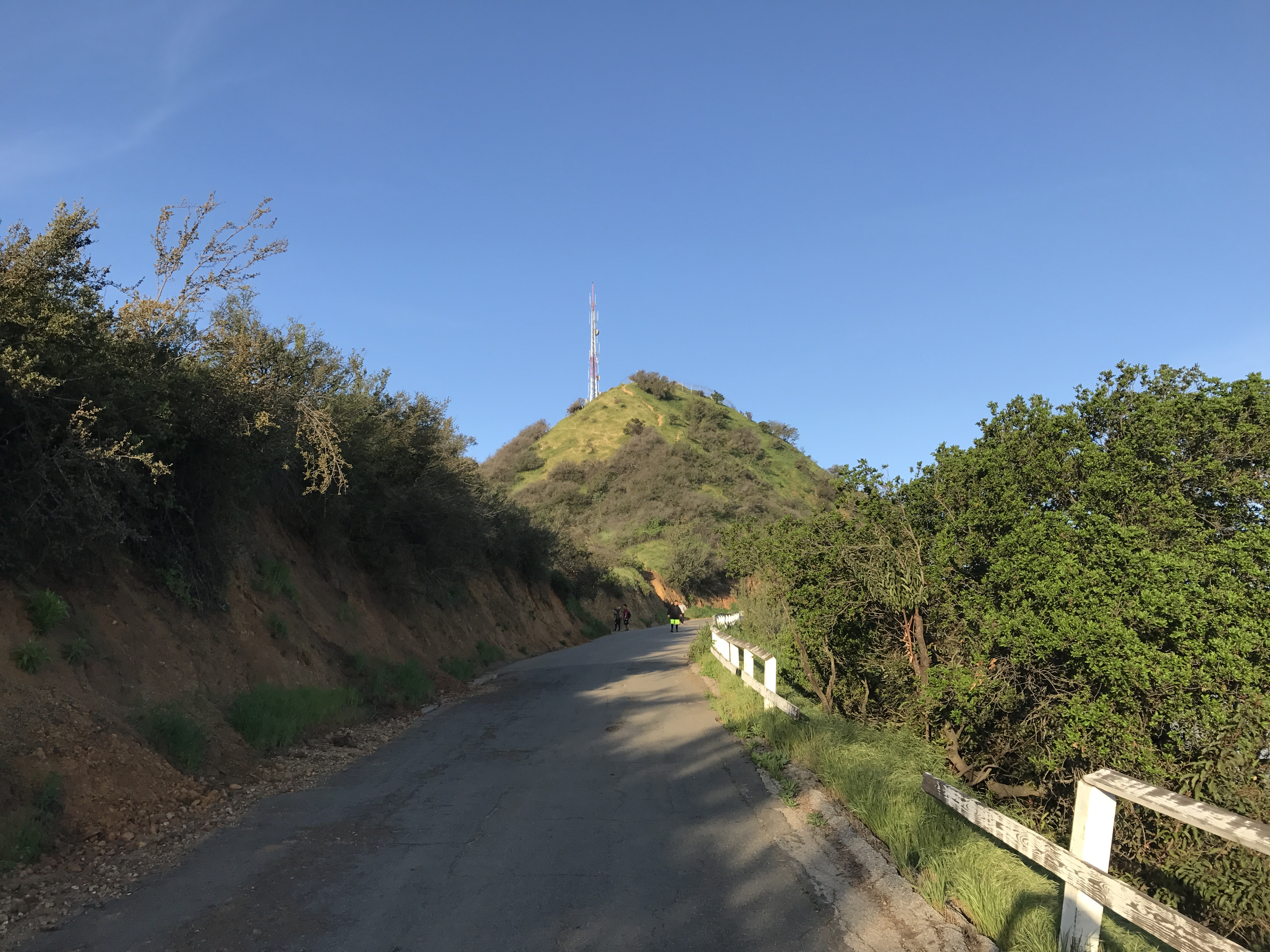
Mount Lee Drive's approach to the Mount Lee summit

Mount Lee is a popular hiking area within the Griffith Park. Orientation maps are located at the entrance to the parking lot near Griffith Observatory. A service road leads from the observatory to numerous hiking routes on and around Mount Lee; however, the immediate area where the Hollywood Sign is located is closed to the public since the area is home to the main communication tower for the City of Los Angeles. Hiking up to Wisdom tree on the western slope of Mount Lee is accessible. Visitors are expected to comply with safety requirements, and must be prepared and equipped adequately.

The view of the Hollywood sign on one of the many hiking trails Mt. Lee offers.

Trails leading to the Hollywood Sign can be accessed from several official Griffith Park entrances. These include the Mt. Hollywood Trail, which can be accessed from the Griffith Observatory parking lot off Vermont Canyon Road or from Vermont Canyon Road just past the Greek Theater, the Bronson Canyon / Brush Canyon Trail (3200 Canyon Drive, Los Angeles, CA), and a number of trailheads that begin near the Griffith Park Visitors Center off Crystal Springs Drive in the Los Feliz section of Los Angeles (free trail maps are available at the Visitors Center). A once-popular trailhead originating at the top of Beachwood Drive was closed by court order in April 2017.

=== Griffith Park ===
Mount Lee's hiking trails and fire roads are part of Griffith Park; as such it's easy to get lost and be redirected. Maps of the trails and the land around the hills should be studied before attempting to hike the area for the first time.

=== Wildlife ===
Wildlife around Mount Lee and the Griffith Park includes coyotes, rattlesnakes, mountain lions, a variety of birds and other species.

P-22, an adult mountain lion, was known to inhabit the park. An image of the cougar was captured on an automatic camera.

Permanent signs on the Griffith Park Observatory deck warn of rattlesnakes in the surrounding area.

Coyotes abound in Griffith Park, especially after dark.

== See also ==
- Santa Monica Mountains topics index
