= Cahuenga Peak =

Mountain in California, United States

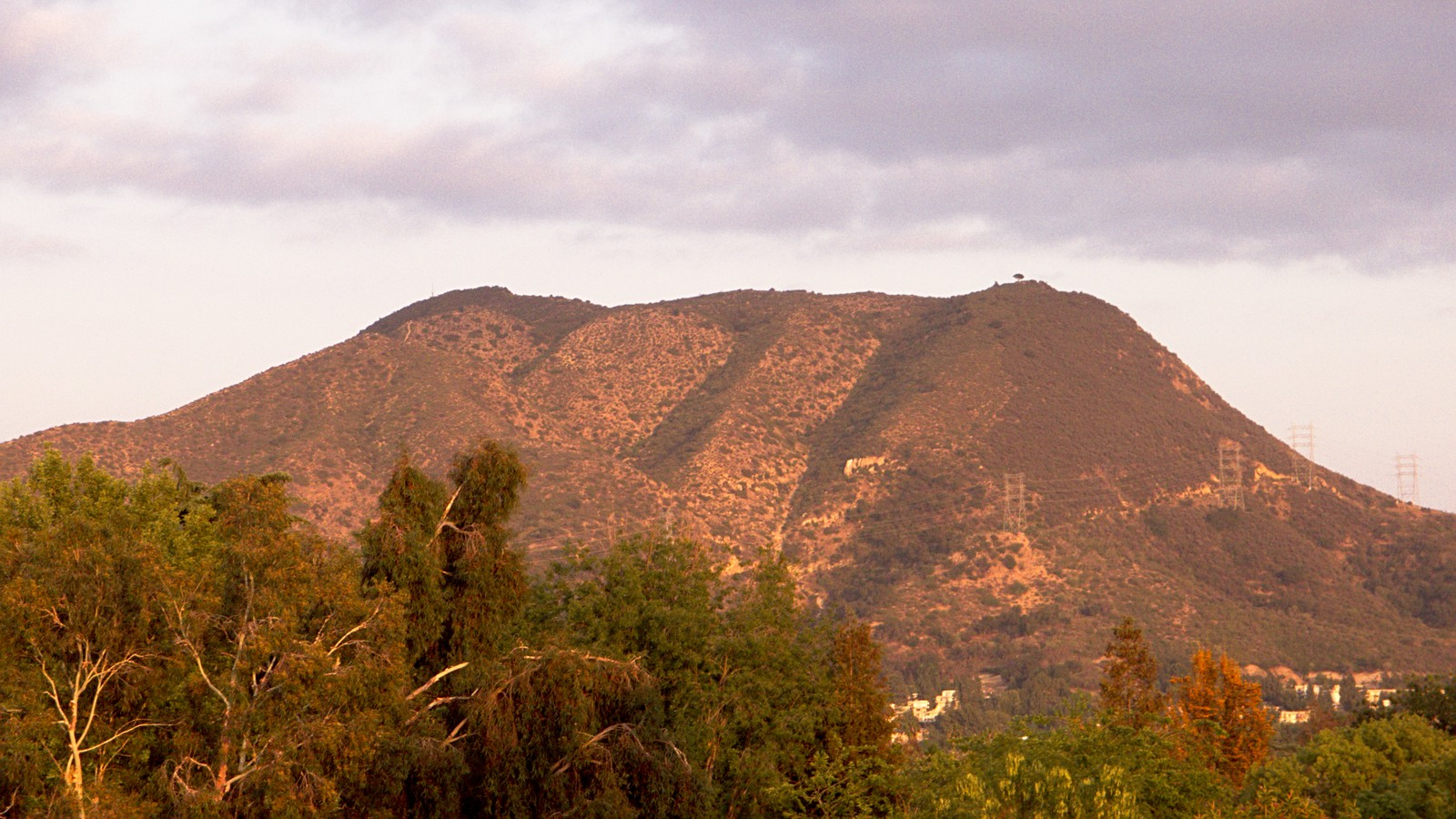
- Cahuenga peak (left) and Burbank peak (right)

Highest point
- Elevation: 1,821 ft (555 m) NAVD 88
- Prominence: 1,030 ft (310 m)
- Coordinates: 34°08′13″N 118°19′33″W

Geography
- Location: Los Angeles County, California, United States
- Parent range: Santa Monica Mountains
- Topo map: USGS Burbank

Cahuenga Peak (/kəˈwɛŋɡə/) is the 12th-highest named peak in the Santa Monica Mountains and is located just west of the Hollywood Sign. Cahuenga Peak is the highest peak in Griffith Park. It provides a spectacular 360-degree panorama of the Los Angeles Basin and the San Fernando Valley.

== History ==
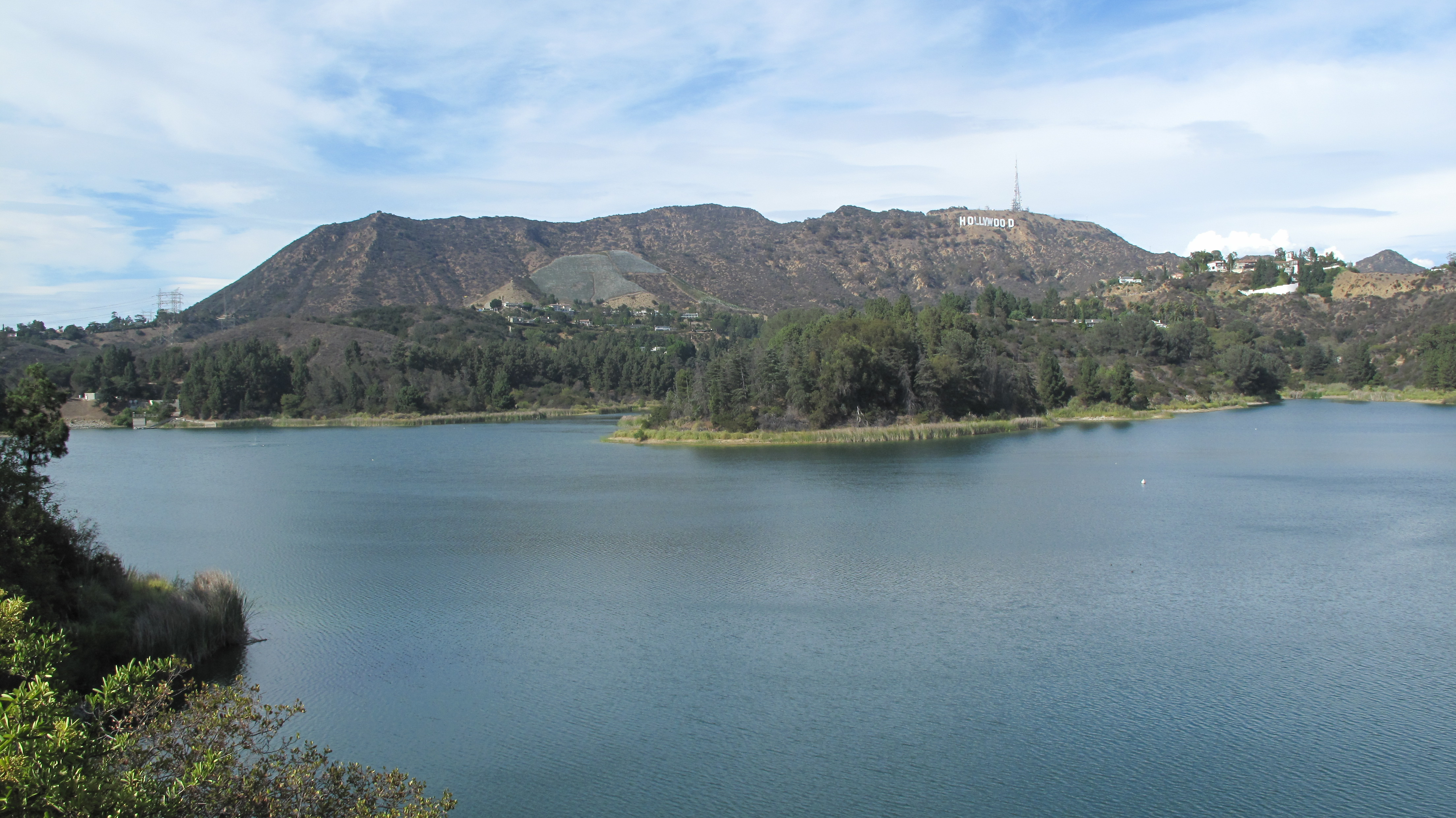
Burbank Peak, Cahuenga Peak, and Mount Lee viewed from the Hollywood Reservoir

Howard Hughes acquired the peak and surrounding acreage in the 1940s with plans to build a house for Ginger Rogers. However, Rogers ended their engagement and so the area was left undeveloped.

=== Conservation ===
In 2002, a group of Chicago-area investors purchased the 138-acre (56 ha) parcel along the ridge including Cahuenga Peak from the Hughes Estate for $1.675 million ($3 million in 2025). The investors considered constructing five luxury estates on the property.

Los Angeles city officials received hundreds of letters pleading for the peak's protection, which prompted a campaign by city leaders and conservationists to raise $6 million ($10.7 million in 2025), an amount they thought sufficient to buy Cahuenga Peak and turn it into an extension of neighboring Griffith Park. On February 13, 2008, the Chicago investors released plans to sell the property for $22 million ($32.9 million in 2025).

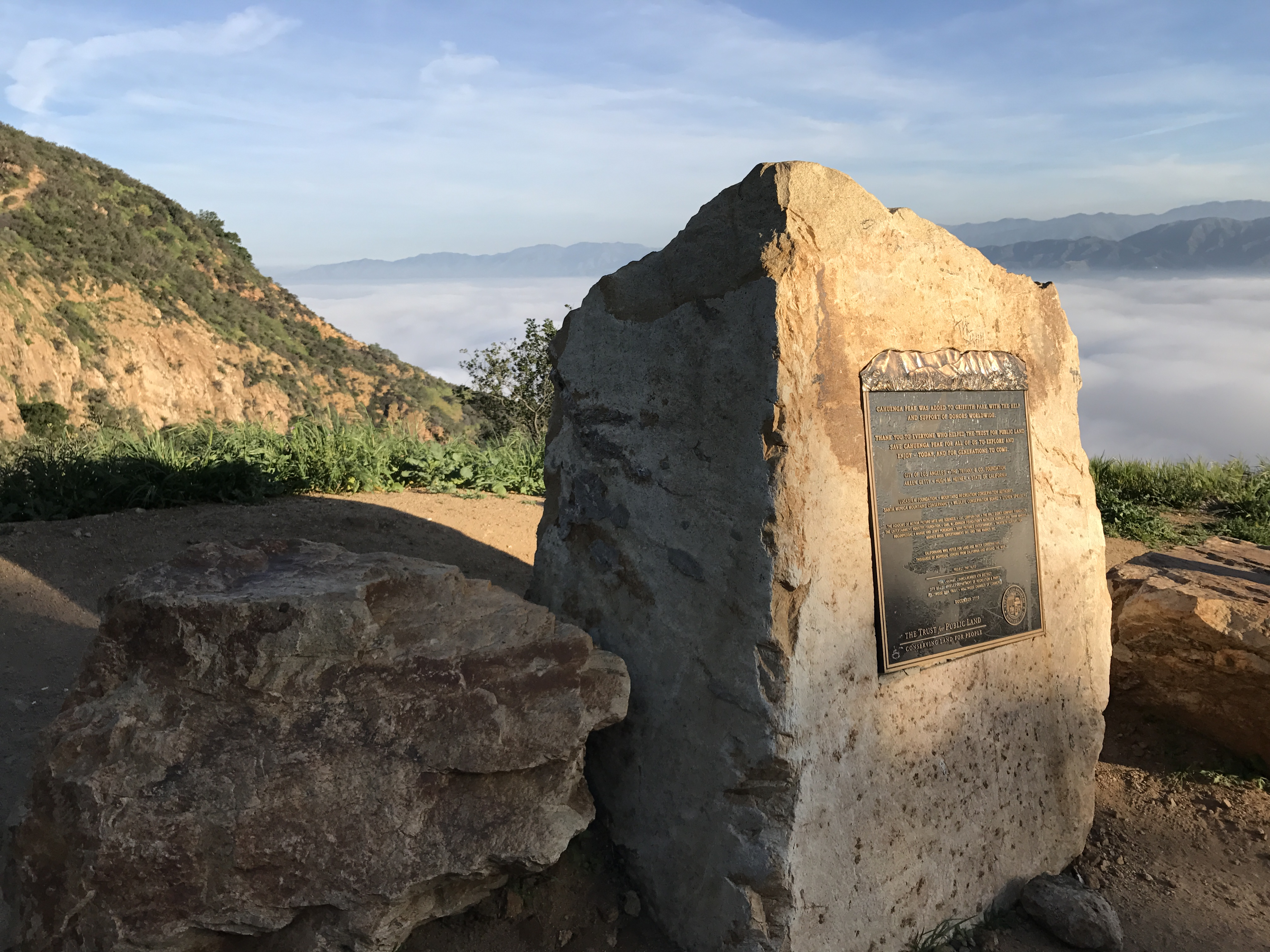
Monument commemorating the addition of Cahuenga Peak to Griffith Park

That same month, The Trust for Public Land launched a campaign to purchase the land for $12.5 million ($19.1 million in 2025). As part of the campaign, the organization draped the Hollywood Sign so that it read "SAVE THE PEAK", and the campaign was announced as successful within three months. Though funds came from many sources, including $1.7 million in public money, it was final-hour donations of $500,000 from The Louis Comfort Tiffany Foundation and Aileen Getty and $900,000 from Hugh Hefner that enabled the purchase.

In July 2010, more than 100 acres (40 ha) around Cahuenga Peak was officially added to Griffith Park.

== Flora and fauna ==
The peak is home to the rare Plummer's mariposa lily, a population of coast horned lizards, and the echo blue butterfly.

== Hiking ==
The Aileen Getty Ridge Trail allows hikers to ascend Cahuenga Peak from the east or west. From the west, the trail approaches from Burbank Peak, from the east, Mount Lee.

== See also ==
- Santa Monica Mountains topics index
