= River LA =

River LA is a nonprofit working on the revitalization of the Los Angeles River. The organization, formerly known as the Los Angeles River Revitalization Corporation, was founded in 2009 by the City of LA to coordinate river policy as part of the Los Angeles River Revitalization Master Plan. River LA has garnered attention for their work with Frank Gehry; their work on the La Kretz Crossing, the first multi-modal cable-stayed bridge of its kind; and their Greenway 2020, a project to create a continuous 51 mile greenway and bike path. In the fall of 2020 they launched Rio Reveals, a multi-year campaign of immersive experiences along the L.A. River, engaging more than 40 artists and the community to promote the river. The organization is led by Executive Director Ed Reyes. Jon Switalski is the current Director of External Affairs.

== Projects ==
River LA recruited Frank Gehry in 2014 to collaborate on the River's revitalization, a decision supported by Mayor Eric M Garcetti. River LA and Gehry Partners have thus far unveiled the River Index, an online database that catalogues research and data on the River.

In 2011, plans were announced for a pedestrian, equestrian and cyclist bridge over the Los Angeles River connecting Griffith Park and Atwater Village. The project is a public-private infrastructure project funded by a public funding and private donations because of a shared focus on alternative transportation. The La Kretz Bridge is the first 21st century bridge to cross the LA River.

In 2017, River LA became a charter member of the Highline Network. The Highline Network is created to support re-use infrastructure projects similar to New York City's High Line, with members including the Atlanta Beltline, Crissy Field, Dequindre Cut, the Lowline, Klyde Warren Park, the Bentway, the Trinity River Project, etc.

In 2020, River LA announced Rio Reveals, a series of events with Los Angeles artists focused on the L.A. River. River LA collaborated with experiential entertainment studio 13Exp and more than 40 artists on this multi-year campaign.
