= Toyon Canyon Landfill =

Coordinates: 34°08′38.36″N 118°18′06.29″W

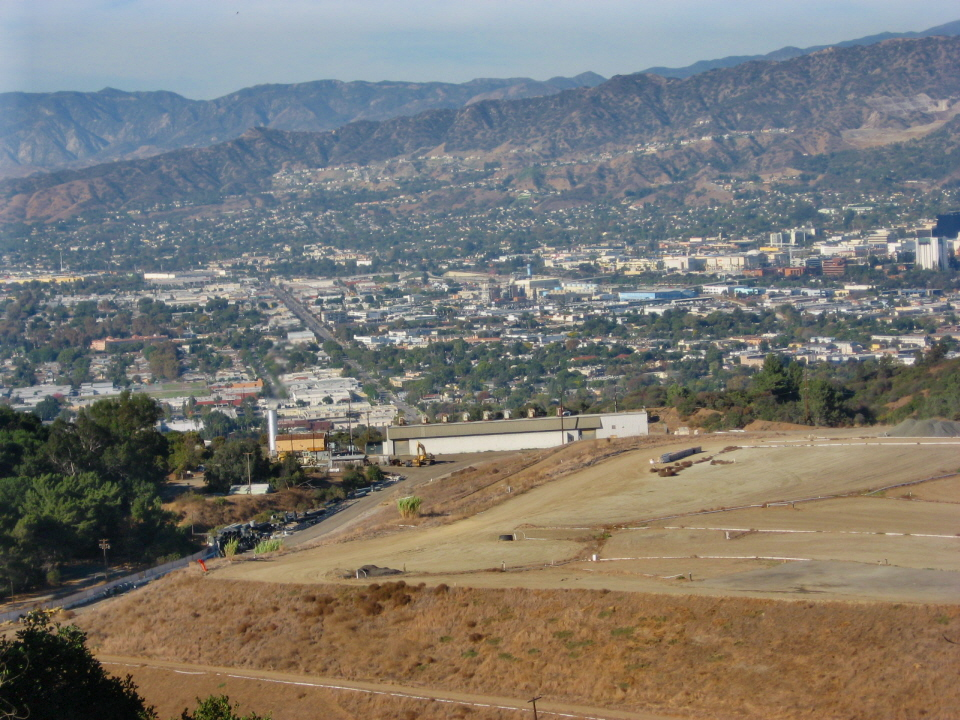
Toyon Canyon from above.

The Toyon Canyon Landfill is located within Griffith Park in the Los Feliz hillside neighborhood of greater Hollywood in central Los Angeles, California in the Santa Monica Mountains. The landfill began filling in 1957 and ended in 1985. A lawsuit in 1959 attempted to stop the project but was unsuccessful. There was a move in the 1980s to expand the landfill into what was then being referred to as Toyon II Canyon to the northwest, but that was defeated. Royce Neuschatz was a city parks and recreation commissioner, and banded together hikers and other outdoor and open space enthusiasts to block the proposal. When Ms. Neuschatz died from cancer at the age of 57, the Toyon II Canyon was renamed to Royce's Canyon in her honor.

Landfill gas is collected from the decomposing waste and used for power generation. The landfill is managed by the Los Angeles Bureau of Sanitation which plans to have "low intensity open meadow area intended for passive recreational activities". The landfill was closed in accordance with the specifications of regulatory agencies on December 31, 2008. The landfill is maintained and monitored in accordance with SCAQMD 1150.1, provisions of AB 32, and other regulations for at least 30 years. The landfill is being landscaped with native plants such as toyon, oak, California poppy, lupine and others, while non-native plants such as mustard and tumbleweed are being actively removed.

In June 2012 the Los Angeles Regional Water Quality Control Board approved a revised Waste Discharge Requirements (permit) for Toyon Canyon, after opportunity for public input. It took effect July 1, 2012.

The landfill is clearly visible from California State Route 2, Route 134 (Ventura Freeway) and I-5 freeways in Los Angeles and from the surrounding hillsides. It is also visible on Google Earth. ( 34° 8'38.36"N 118°18'6.29"W)

During the May 2007 fire in Griffith Park, the helispot was used to help fight the fire.

== Technical data ==
- Filled Area: 90 acres (360,000 m^{2})
- Total Weight of Trash: 16,000,000 tons
- Total Volume of fill: 30,700,000 cubic yards
- Type of Material Disposed of: Class III waste (residential garbage, street sweepings, Construction and demolition waste)
- Number of Gas Extraction Wells: 200 approx.
- Active Groundwater Monitoring Wells: 13
- Landfill Gas Migration Monitoring Probes: 16 (single and multi-depth)
- Ambient Air Monitoring Stations: 2
- AQMD Site permits (on AQMD's site with emissions and compliance data): LA City, Power Plant - current, and Power Plant - older.
- Power Generation Equipment: 2 internal combustion engines
- Power Plant Owner: Montauk Energy
- Power Plant Operator: SCS Engineers
- Landfill Gas Flare: John Zink 8-foot (2.4 m) diameter, 5 burner tips, 2000 cfm capacity (on standby).
- Regulatory Agencies: United States Environmental Protection Agency, Cal. EPA, California Integrated Waste Management Board, California Air Resources Board, SCAQMD, State Water Resources Control Board - Los Angeles, City of Los Angeles - Industrial Waste Management Division, and City of Los Angeles - Environmental Affairs Department - Local Enforcement Agency.

== See also ==
- Landfill in the United States
