= La Kretz Bridge =

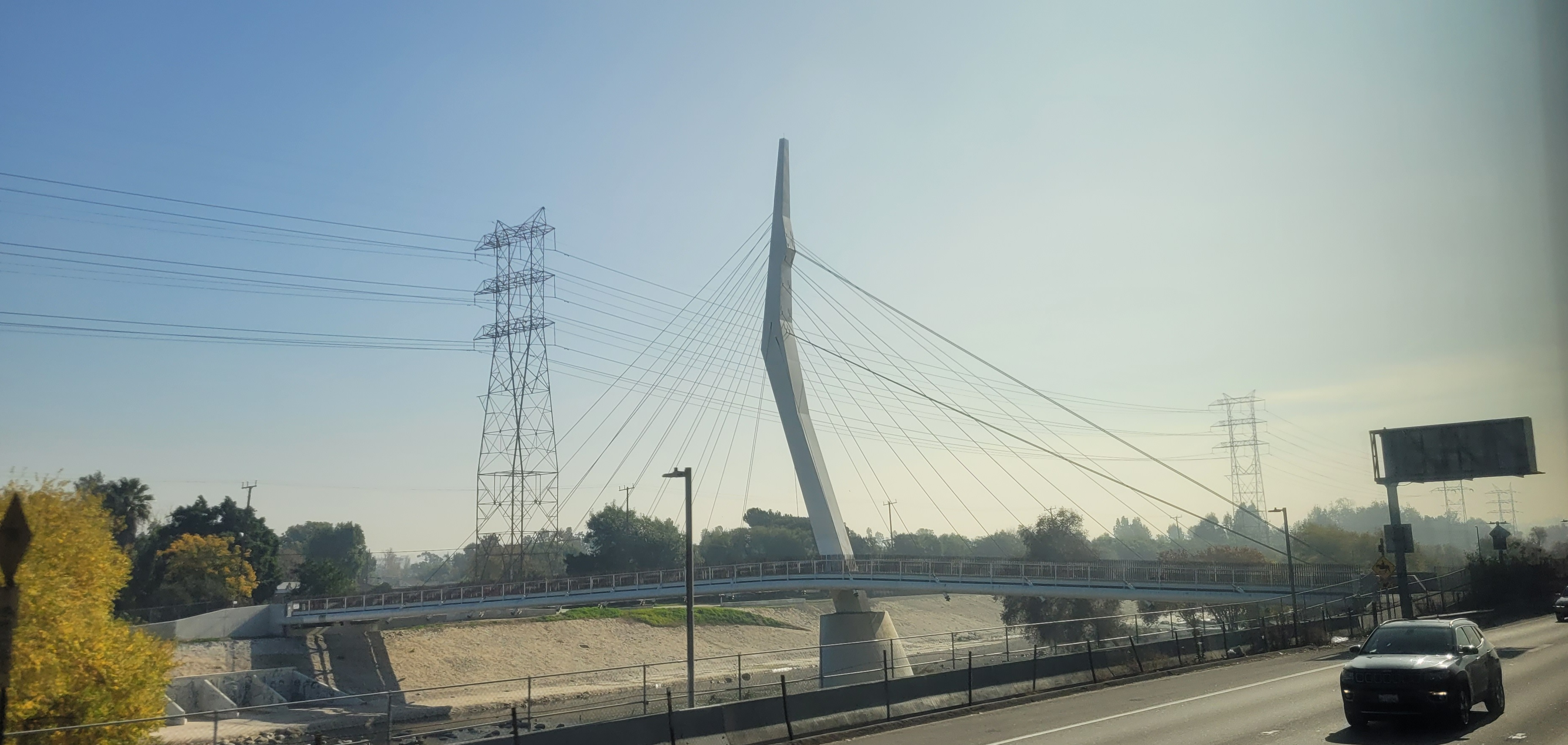
- The La Kretz Bridge, viewed from Interstate 5 in 2025
- Coordinates: 34.130710°N 118.273706°W
- Carries: Pedestrians
- Crosses: Los Angeles River
- Locale: Atwater Village
- Other name: North Atwater Bridge

Characteristics
- Total length: 300 ft (91 m)

History
- Opened: 2020; 5 years ago

Location
- Interactive map of La Kretz Bridge

La Kretz Bridge, also known as the North Atwater Bridge or La Kretz Crossing, is a cable-stayed steel pedestrian bridge that crosses the Los Angeles River, linking Griffith Park with Atwater Village, Los Angeles, immediately south of North Atwater Park. La Kretz Bridge has a length of 325 feet (99 m) and span of 35 feet (11 m). The bridge is noted for a white spire that rises 126 feet (38 m) and uses 300,000 pounds (140,000 kg) of steel. It was completed in February 2020, and is the 2nd bridge crossing the Los Angeles River to be completed in the 21st century.

== History ==
La Kretz Bridge was initially envisioned as a privately funded bridge, driven by a desire in 1998 by John Ferraro to build an equestrian bridge north of Los Feliz Boulevard. Morton La Kretz, a local philanthropist, donated $4.75 million toward the bridge's research, design and construction expenses.

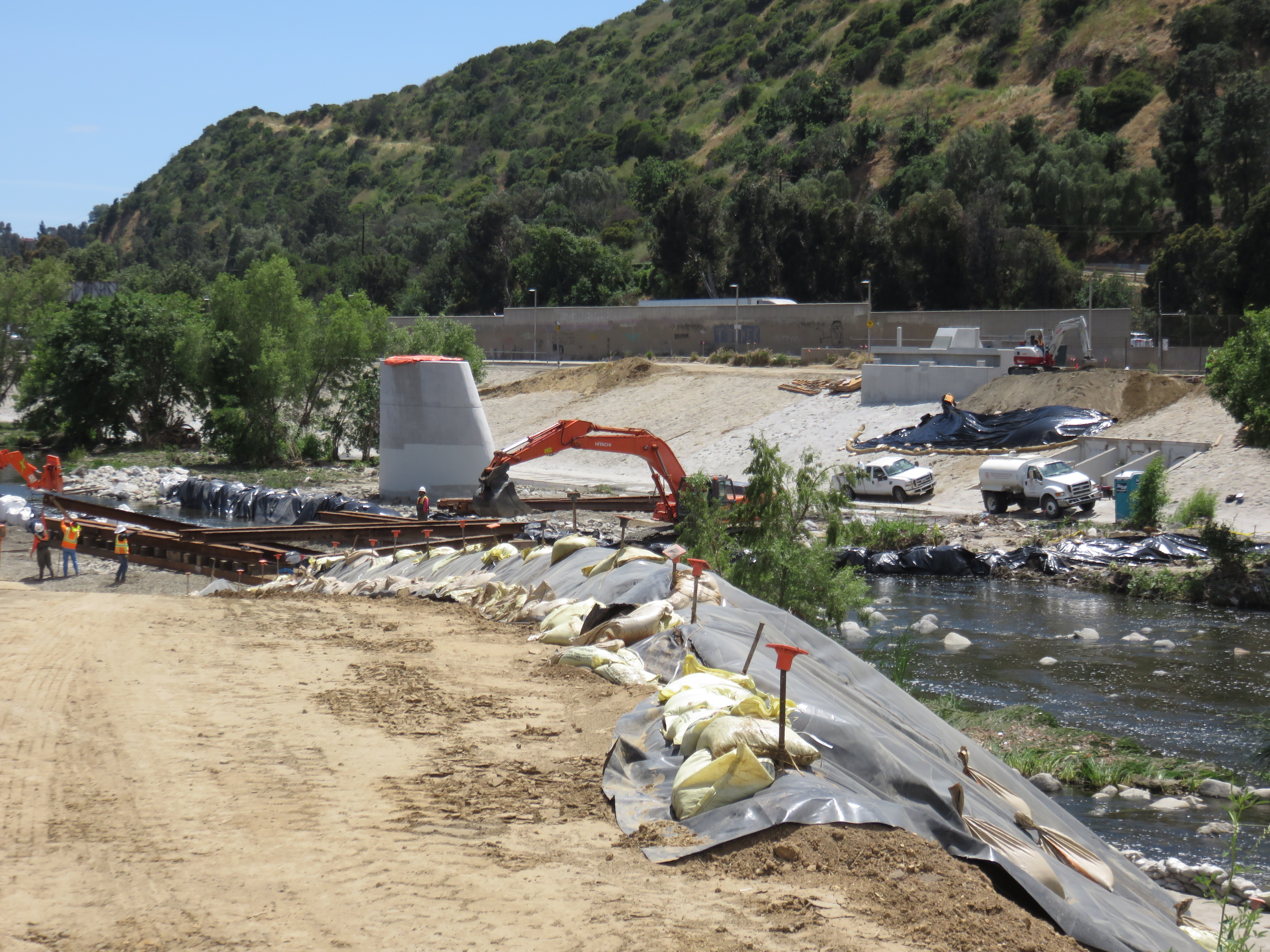
The bridge under construction in 2019

In 2017, the Los Angeles City Council approved the construction of the bridge. The bridge was constructed at a cost of $16.1 million, with about 75% of the total costs borne by taxpayer funds, supplemented with fundraising efforts led by River LA. The city's budgetary estimates in 2012 had projected that the bridge would cost $4.67 million.

== See also ==
- Atwater Village
- Los Angeles River
- Griffith Park
