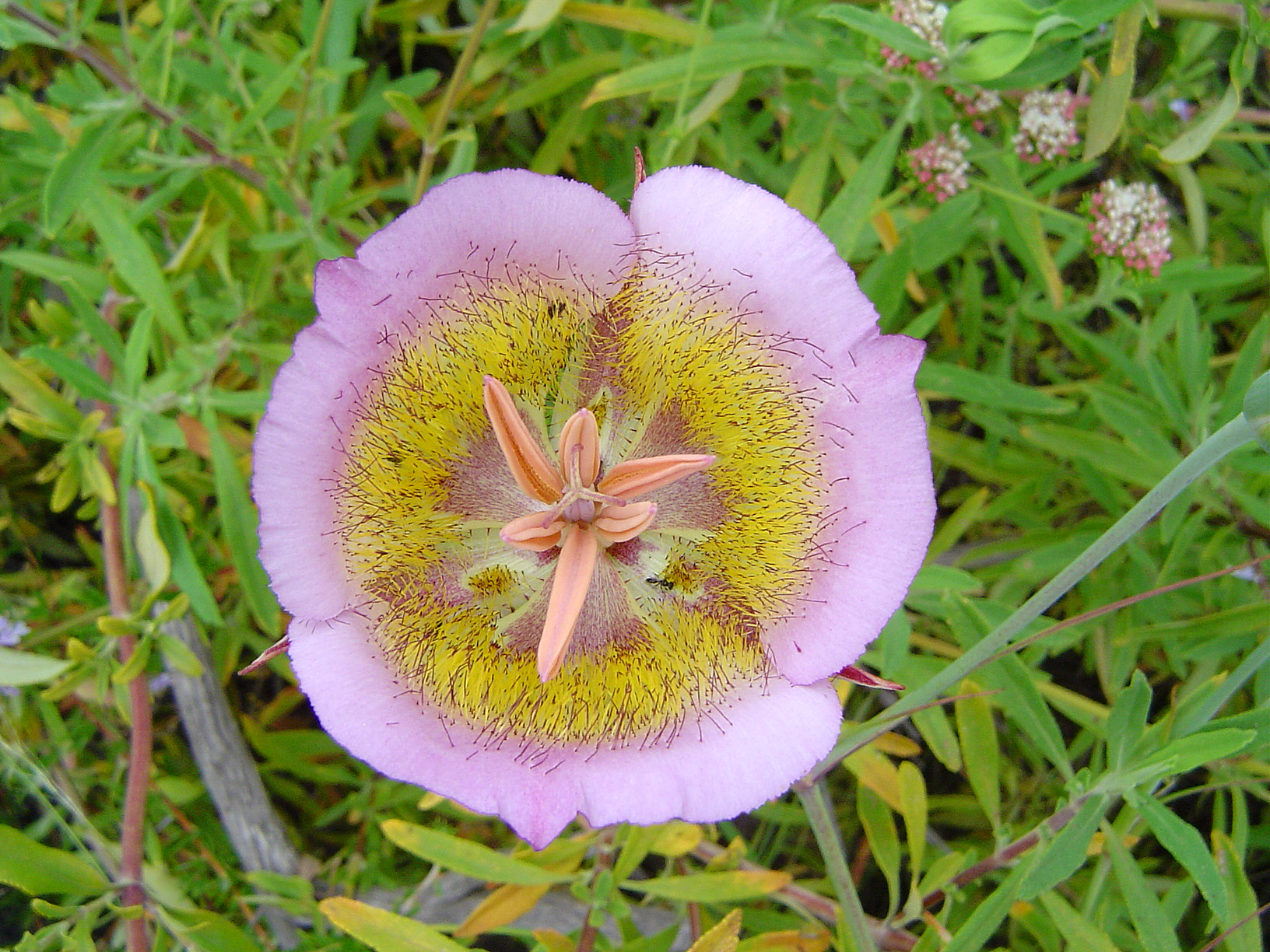
- In Franklin Canyon Park; Santa Monica Mountains

Conservation status
- Apparently Secure (NatureServe)

Scientific classification
- Kingdom: Plantae
- Clade: Tracheophytes
- Clade: Angiosperms
- Clade: Monocots
- Order: Liliales
- Family: Liliaceae
- Genus: Calochortus
- Species: C. plummerae

Binomial name
- Calochortus plummerae Greene

Synonyms
- Cyclobothra plummerae (Greene) Hoover

= Calochortus plummerae =

Species of flowering plant

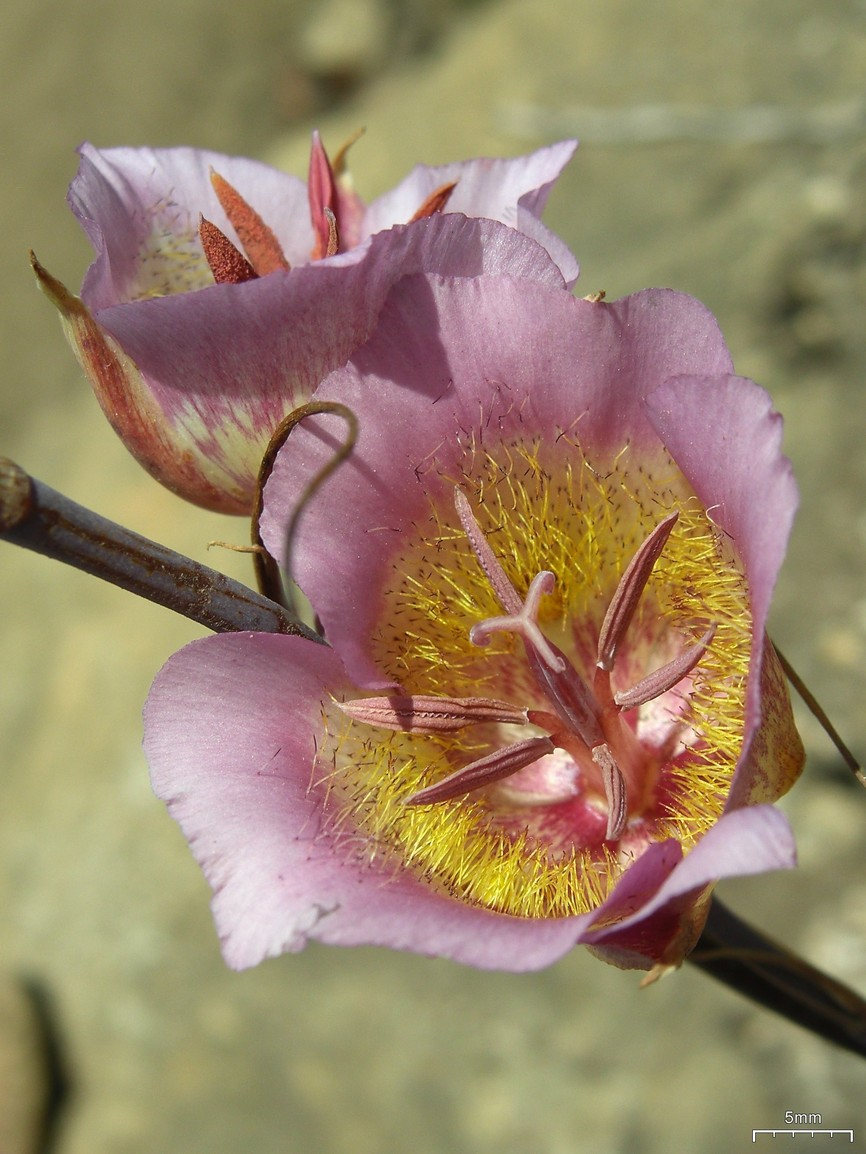
At Mount Wilson, San Gabriel Mountains, California.

Calochortus plummerae is a species of mariposa lily known by the common name Plummer's mariposa lily.

It is endemic to Southern California where it is found along the coast, inland hills, and some Transverse Ranges and Peninsular Ranges. It is a member of the chaparral, grasslands, and lower montane coniferous forest plant communities.

The species is named in honor of American botanist Sara Plummer Lemmon (1836 – 1923).

== Description ==
Calochortus plummerae produces thin, branching stems and a few long curling leaves.

Atop the stem is a lily bloom with long, pointed sepals and petals which may be up to 4 centimeters long. The petals are pink, lavender, or white with a wide yellow band across the middle. They are hairy inside and sometimes fringed with hairs. The center contains large whitish or yellowish anthers. Flowers are present from May to July.

The fruit capsule is up to 8 centimeters long.
